

496001–496100 

|-bgcolor=#FFC2E0
| 496001 ||  || — || November 8, 2007 || Catalina || CSS || AMO +1km || align=right | 1.1 km || 
|-id=002 bgcolor=#fefefe
| 496002 ||  || — || October 9, 2007 || Kitt Peak || Spacewatch ||  || align=right data-sort-value="0.62" | 620 m || 
|-id=003 bgcolor=#d6d6d6
| 496003 ||  || — || October 20, 2007 || Mount Lemmon || Mount Lemmon Survey ||  || align=right | 3.0 km || 
|-id=004 bgcolor=#fefefe
| 496004 ||  || — || November 8, 2007 || Catalina || CSS || H || align=right data-sort-value="0.79" | 790 m || 
|-id=005 bgcolor=#FFC2E0
| 496005 ||  || — || December 5, 2007 || Kitt Peak || Spacewatch || APOPHAcritical || align=right data-sort-value="0.54" | 540 m || 
|-id=006 bgcolor=#d6d6d6
| 496006 ||  || — || December 6, 2007 || Kitt Peak || Spacewatch || TIR || align=right | 2.9 km || 
|-id=007 bgcolor=#d6d6d6
| 496007 ||  || — || September 27, 2007 || Mount Lemmon || Mount Lemmon Survey ||  || align=right | 4.3 km || 
|-id=008 bgcolor=#d6d6d6
| 496008 ||  || — || December 15, 2007 || Socorro || LINEAR || EUP || align=right | 3.5 km || 
|-id=009 bgcolor=#fefefe
| 496009 ||  || — || November 5, 2007 || Kitt Peak || Spacewatch ||  || align=right data-sort-value="0.65" | 650 m || 
|-id=010 bgcolor=#fefefe
| 496010 ||  || — || December 20, 2007 || Mount Lemmon || Mount Lemmon Survey || H || align=right data-sort-value="0.96" | 960 m || 
|-id=011 bgcolor=#E9E9E9
| 496011 ||  || — || January 1, 2008 || Kitt Peak || Spacewatch ||  || align=right | 1.6 km || 
|-id=012 bgcolor=#d6d6d6
| 496012 ||  || — || February 28, 2008 || Mount Lemmon || Mount Lemmon Survey || ALA || align=right | 3.7 km || 
|-id=013 bgcolor=#FFC2E0
| 496013 ||  || — || March 5, 2008 || Socorro || LINEAR || APOPHA || align=right data-sort-value="0.25" | 250 m || 
|-id=014 bgcolor=#E9E9E9
| 496014 ||  || — || February 2, 2008 || Kitt Peak || Spacewatch ||  || align=right | 1.2 km || 
|-id=015 bgcolor=#E9E9E9
| 496015 ||  || — || April 6, 2008 || Mount Lemmon || Mount Lemmon Survey ||  || align=right | 1.3 km || 
|-id=016 bgcolor=#E9E9E9
| 496016 ||  || — || April 7, 2008 || Catalina || CSS ||  || align=right | 2.0 km || 
|-id=017 bgcolor=#E9E9E9
| 496017 ||  || — || January 27, 2007 || Mount Lemmon || Mount Lemmon Survey ||  || align=right | 1.6 km || 
|-id=018 bgcolor=#FFC2E0
| 496018 ||  || — || July 1, 2008 || Catalina || CSS || AMO +1kmcritical || align=right | 1.2 km || 
|-id=019 bgcolor=#E9E9E9
| 496019 ||  || — || July 31, 2008 || La Sagra || OAM Obs. ||  || align=right | 2.6 km || 
|-id=020 bgcolor=#E9E9E9
| 496020 ||  || — || August 10, 2008 || Hibiscus || S. F. Hönig, N. Teamo ||  || align=right | 2.0 km || 
|-id=021 bgcolor=#fefefe
| 496021 ||  || — || August 24, 2008 || La Sagra || OAM Obs. ||  || align=right data-sort-value="0.54" | 540 m || 
|-id=022 bgcolor=#E9E9E9
| 496022 ||  || — || July 8, 2008 || Mount Lemmon || Mount Lemmon Survey ||  || align=right | 3.2 km || 
|-id=023 bgcolor=#E9E9E9
| 496023 ||  || — || September 4, 2008 || Kitt Peak || Spacewatch ||  || align=right | 3.1 km || 
|-id=024 bgcolor=#E9E9E9
| 496024 ||  || — || September 6, 2008 || Catalina || CSS ||  || align=right | 1.5 km || 
|-id=025 bgcolor=#d6d6d6
| 496025 ||  || — || September 7, 2008 || Mount Lemmon || Mount Lemmon Survey ||  || align=right | 1.6 km || 
|-id=026 bgcolor=#E9E9E9
| 496026 ||  || — || September 3, 2008 || Kitt Peak || Spacewatch ||  || align=right | 2.0 km || 
|-id=027 bgcolor=#E9E9E9
| 496027 ||  || — || September 9, 2008 || Mount Lemmon || Mount Lemmon Survey ||  || align=right | 1.8 km || 
|-id=028 bgcolor=#E9E9E9
| 496028 ||  || — || August 24, 2008 || La Sagra || OAM Obs. ||  || align=right | 2.6 km || 
|-id=029 bgcolor=#E9E9E9
| 496029 ||  || — || September 20, 2008 || Mount Lemmon || Mount Lemmon Survey ||  || align=right | 3.3 km || 
|-id=030 bgcolor=#E9E9E9
| 496030 ||  || — || September 24, 2008 || Mount Lemmon || Mount Lemmon Survey ||  || align=right | 1.1 km || 
|-id=031 bgcolor=#C2FFFF
| 496031 ||  || — || September 21, 2008 || Kitt Peak || Spacewatch || L4ERY || align=right | 7.9 km || 
|-id=032 bgcolor=#E9E9E9
| 496032 ||  || — || September 22, 2008 || Catalina || CSS ||  || align=right | 2.6 km || 
|-id=033 bgcolor=#d6d6d6
| 496033 ||  || — || October 2, 2008 || Kitt Peak || Spacewatch ||  || align=right | 2.1 km || 
|-id=034 bgcolor=#d6d6d6
| 496034 ||  || — || September 23, 2008 || Mount Lemmon || Mount Lemmon Survey || KAR || align=right | 1.8 km || 
|-id=035 bgcolor=#d6d6d6
| 496035 ||  || — || October 9, 2008 || Kitt Peak || Spacewatch ||  || align=right | 2.3 km || 
|-id=036 bgcolor=#d6d6d6
| 496036 ||  || — || October 22, 2008 || Kitt Peak || Spacewatch ||  || align=right | 3.0 km || 
|-id=037 bgcolor=#fefefe
| 496037 ||  || — || September 22, 2008 || Mount Lemmon || Mount Lemmon Survey ||  || align=right data-sort-value="0.57" | 570 m || 
|-id=038 bgcolor=#d6d6d6
| 496038 ||  || — || October 26, 2008 || Kitt Peak || Spacewatch || URS || align=right | 4.9 km || 
|-id=039 bgcolor=#d6d6d6
| 496039 ||  || — || October 23, 2008 || Kitt Peak || Spacewatch ||  || align=right | 2.5 km || 
|-id=040 bgcolor=#E9E9E9
| 496040 ||  || — || October 31, 2008 || Catalina || CSS ||  || align=right | 2.1 km || 
|-id=041 bgcolor=#d6d6d6
| 496041 ||  || — || October 22, 2008 || Kitt Peak || Spacewatch ||  || align=right | 4.2 km || 
|-id=042 bgcolor=#d6d6d6
| 496042 ||  || — || November 6, 2008 || Kitt Peak || Spacewatch ||  || align=right | 3.8 km || 
|-id=043 bgcolor=#d6d6d6
| 496043 ||  || — || October 1, 2008 || Mount Lemmon || Mount Lemmon Survey ||  || align=right | 2.2 km || 
|-id=044 bgcolor=#d6d6d6
| 496044 ||  || — || November 17, 2008 || Kitt Peak || Spacewatch || Tj (2.99) || align=right | 5.5 km || 
|-id=045 bgcolor=#d6d6d6
| 496045 ||  || — || November 1, 2008 || Catalina || CSS || TIR || align=right | 3.2 km || 
|-id=046 bgcolor=#E9E9E9
| 496046 ||  || — || October 20, 2008 || Mount Lemmon || Mount Lemmon Survey ||  || align=right | 2.6 km || 
|-id=047 bgcolor=#d6d6d6
| 496047 ||  || — || November 21, 2008 || Kitt Peak || Spacewatch ||  || align=right | 2.5 km || 
|-id=048 bgcolor=#E9E9E9
| 496048 ||  || — || October 4, 2008 || Mount Lemmon || Mount Lemmon Survey ||  || align=right | 1.8 km || 
|-id=049 bgcolor=#d6d6d6
| 496049 ||  || — || December 29, 2008 || Mayhill || A. Lowe || EUP || align=right | 4.2 km || 
|-id=050 bgcolor=#fefefe
| 496050 ||  || — || January 3, 2009 || Kitt Peak || Spacewatch || H || align=right data-sort-value="0.52" | 520 m || 
|-id=051 bgcolor=#d6d6d6
| 496051 ||  || — || January 1, 2009 || Kitt Peak || Spacewatch || EUP || align=right | 3.3 km || 
|-id=052 bgcolor=#fefefe
| 496052 ||  || — || January 15, 2009 || Kitt Peak || Spacewatch ||  || align=right data-sort-value="0.67" | 670 m || 
|-id=053 bgcolor=#fefefe
| 496053 ||  || — || January 15, 2009 || Kitt Peak || Spacewatch ||  || align=right data-sort-value="0.61" | 610 m || 
|-id=054 bgcolor=#fefefe
| 496054 ||  || — || October 24, 2008 || Mount Lemmon || Mount Lemmon Survey ||  || align=right data-sort-value="0.72" | 720 m || 
|-id=055 bgcolor=#d6d6d6
| 496055 ||  || — || January 20, 2009 || Catalina || CSS ||  || align=right | 2.8 km || 
|-id=056 bgcolor=#d6d6d6
| 496056 ||  || — || December 21, 2008 || Catalina || CSS ||  || align=right | 2.8 km || 
|-id=057 bgcolor=#d6d6d6
| 496057 ||  || — || February 1, 2009 || Kitt Peak || Spacewatch || VER || align=right | 2.2 km || 
|-id=058 bgcolor=#fefefe
| 496058 ||  || — || February 28, 2009 || Kitt Peak || Spacewatch ||  || align=right data-sort-value="0.82" | 820 m || 
|-id=059 bgcolor=#fefefe
| 496059 ||  || — || February 19, 2009 || La Sagra || OAM Obs. ||  || align=right data-sort-value="0.79" | 790 m || 
|-id=060 bgcolor=#fefefe
| 496060 ||  || — || February 19, 2009 || Kitt Peak || Spacewatch ||  || align=right data-sort-value="0.70" | 700 m || 
|-id=061 bgcolor=#fefefe
| 496061 ||  || — || April 4, 2009 || Cerro Burek || Alianza S4 Obs. || NYS || align=right data-sort-value="0.75" | 750 m || 
|-id=062 bgcolor=#fefefe
| 496062 ||  || — || May 13, 2009 || Kitt Peak || Spacewatch ||  || align=right | 1.0 km || 
|-id=063 bgcolor=#E9E9E9
| 496063 ||  || — || July 29, 2009 || Kitt Peak || Spacewatch ||  || align=right | 1.5 km || 
|-id=064 bgcolor=#E9E9E9
| 496064 ||  || — || July 29, 2009 || Kitt Peak || Spacewatch || critical || align=right data-sort-value="0.98" | 980 m || 
|-id=065 bgcolor=#E9E9E9
| 496065 ||  || — || July 27, 2009 || Catalina || CSS ||  || align=right | 1.9 km || 
|-id=066 bgcolor=#E9E9E9
| 496066 ||  || — || August 15, 2009 || Kitt Peak || Spacewatch ||  || align=right | 1.8 km || 
|-id=067 bgcolor=#E9E9E9
| 496067 ||  || — || August 22, 2009 || La Sagra || OAM Obs. ||  || align=right | 1.6 km || 
|-id=068 bgcolor=#E9E9E9
| 496068 ||  || — || July 31, 2009 || Catalina || CSS ||  || align=right | 1.7 km || 
|-id=069 bgcolor=#E9E9E9
| 496069 ||  || — || September 13, 2009 || Purple Mountain || PMO NEO ||  || align=right | 1.2 km || 
|-id=070 bgcolor=#E9E9E9
| 496070 ||  || — || August 28, 2009 || Catalina || CSS ||  || align=right | 1.6 km || 
|-id=071 bgcolor=#E9E9E9
| 496071 ||  || — || September 14, 2009 || Kitt Peak || Spacewatch ||  || align=right data-sort-value="0.59" | 590 m || 
|-id=072 bgcolor=#E9E9E9
| 496072 ||  || — || September 15, 2009 || Kitt Peak || Spacewatch ||  || align=right | 1.5 km || 
|-id=073 bgcolor=#C2FFFF
| 496073 ||  || — || September 15, 2009 || Kitt Peak || Spacewatch || L4 || align=right | 8.7 km || 
|-id=074 bgcolor=#E9E9E9
| 496074 ||  || — || September 14, 2009 || Socorro || LINEAR ||  || align=right | 1.1 km || 
|-id=075 bgcolor=#C2FFFF
| 496075 ||  || — || April 4, 2003 || Kitt Peak || Spacewatch || L4 || align=right | 9.2 km || 
|-id=076 bgcolor=#E9E9E9
| 496076 ||  || — || September 17, 2009 || La Sagra || OAM Obs. ||  || align=right data-sort-value="0.90" | 900 m || 
|-id=077 bgcolor=#E9E9E9
| 496077 ||  || — || September 17, 2009 || Catalina || CSS ||  || align=right | 1.1 km || 
|-id=078 bgcolor=#E9E9E9
| 496078 ||  || — || September 16, 2009 || Kitt Peak || Spacewatch ||  || align=right | 1.2 km || 
|-id=079 bgcolor=#E9E9E9
| 496079 ||  || — || September 17, 2009 || Kitt Peak || Spacewatch ||  || align=right | 1.8 km || 
|-id=080 bgcolor=#E9E9E9
| 496080 ||  || — || September 17, 2009 || Kitt Peak || Spacewatch ||  || align=right | 1.5 km || 
|-id=081 bgcolor=#E9E9E9
| 496081 ||  || — || September 25, 2009 || La Sagra || OAM Obs. ||  || align=right | 6.7 km || 
|-id=082 bgcolor=#E9E9E9
| 496082 ||  || — || September 18, 2009 || Kitt Peak || Spacewatch ||  || align=right data-sort-value="0.87" | 870 m || 
|-id=083 bgcolor=#d6d6d6
| 496083 ||  || — || September 18, 2009 || Kitt Peak || Spacewatch ||  || align=right | 1.9 km || 
|-id=084 bgcolor=#E9E9E9
| 496084 ||  || — || September 18, 2009 || Kitt Peak || Spacewatch || AGN || align=right | 2.4 km || 
|-id=085 bgcolor=#E9E9E9
| 496085 ||  || — || September 19, 2009 || Kitt Peak || Spacewatch ||  || align=right | 1.8 km || 
|-id=086 bgcolor=#E9E9E9
| 496086 ||  || — || September 20, 2009 || Kitt Peak || Spacewatch ||  || align=right | 2.0 km || 
|-id=087 bgcolor=#E9E9E9
| 496087 ||  || — || August 28, 2009 || La Sagra || OAM Obs. ||  || align=right | 1.0 km || 
|-id=088 bgcolor=#E9E9E9
| 496088 ||  || — || August 27, 2009 || Kitt Peak || Spacewatch ||  || align=right | 2.1 km || 
|-id=089 bgcolor=#E9E9E9
| 496089 ||  || — || September 22, 2009 || Kitt Peak || Spacewatch ||  || align=right | 1.7 km || 
|-id=090 bgcolor=#E9E9E9
| 496090 ||  || — || September 24, 2009 || La Sagra || OAM Obs. ||  || align=right | 1.5 km || 
|-id=091 bgcolor=#E9E9E9
| 496091 ||  || — || September 21, 2009 || Catalina || CSS ||  || align=right | 1.7 km || 
|-id=092 bgcolor=#E9E9E9
| 496092 ||  || — || September 25, 2009 || Kitt Peak || Spacewatch ||  || align=right | 1.3 km || 
|-id=093 bgcolor=#E9E9E9
| 496093 ||  || — || September 19, 2009 || Mount Lemmon || Mount Lemmon Survey ||  || align=right data-sort-value="0.83" | 830 m || 
|-id=094 bgcolor=#E9E9E9
| 496094 ||  || — || August 19, 2009 || Catalina || CSS ||  || align=right | 1.8 km || 
|-id=095 bgcolor=#E9E9E9
| 496095 ||  || — || October 12, 2009 || La Sagra || OAM Obs. ||  || align=right | 2.3 km || 
|-id=096 bgcolor=#E9E9E9
| 496096 ||  || — || September 14, 2009 || Socorro || LINEAR ||  || align=right | 1.7 km || 
|-id=097 bgcolor=#E9E9E9
| 496097 ||  || — || October 9, 2009 || Catalina || CSS || EUN || align=right | 1.4 km || 
|-id=098 bgcolor=#E9E9E9
| 496098 ||  || — || October 26, 2009 || Mount Lemmon || Mount Lemmon Survey || BAR || align=right | 2.4 km || 
|-id=099 bgcolor=#d6d6d6
| 496099 ||  || — || October 23, 2009 || Mount Lemmon || Mount Lemmon Survey ||  || align=right | 4.2 km || 
|-id=100 bgcolor=#E9E9E9
| 496100 ||  || — || December 13, 1996 || Kitt Peak || Spacewatch ||  || align=right | 1.3 km || 
|}

496101–496200 

|-bgcolor=#E9E9E9
| 496101 ||  || — || October 27, 2009 || La Sagra || OAM Obs. ||  || align=right | 2.3 km || 
|-id=102 bgcolor=#E9E9E9
| 496102 ||  || — || October 22, 2009 || Mount Lemmon || Mount Lemmon Survey ||  || align=right data-sort-value="0.84" | 840 m || 
|-id=103 bgcolor=#E9E9E9
| 496103 ||  || — || November 8, 2009 || Mount Lemmon || Mount Lemmon Survey ||  || align=right | 2.4 km || 
|-id=104 bgcolor=#E9E9E9
| 496104 ||  || — || November 12, 2009 || La Sagra || OAM Obs. || GEF || align=right | 2.0 km || 
|-id=105 bgcolor=#d6d6d6
| 496105 ||  || — || November 9, 2009 || Kitt Peak || Spacewatch ||  || align=right | 2.3 km || 
|-id=106 bgcolor=#d6d6d6
| 496106 ||  || — || October 12, 2009 || Mount Lemmon || Mount Lemmon Survey ||  || align=right | 1.9 km || 
|-id=107 bgcolor=#E9E9E9
| 496107 ||  || — || November 15, 2009 || Catalina || CSS ||  || align=right | 1.1 km || 
|-id=108 bgcolor=#E9E9E9
| 496108 ||  || — || October 26, 2009 || Kitt Peak || Spacewatch ||  || align=right | 1.6 km || 
|-id=109 bgcolor=#E9E9E9
| 496109 ||  || — || October 25, 2009 || Kitt Peak || Spacewatch ||  || align=right | 2.0 km || 
|-id=110 bgcolor=#E9E9E9
| 496110 ||  || — || November 11, 2009 || Kitt Peak || Spacewatch || critical || align=right | 2.2 km || 
|-id=111 bgcolor=#E9E9E9
| 496111 ||  || — || October 18, 2009 || La Sagra || OAM Obs. || MIS || align=right | 2.2 km || 
|-id=112 bgcolor=#fefefe
| 496112 ||  || — || November 21, 2009 || Kitt Peak || Spacewatch ||  || align=right data-sort-value="0.56" | 560 m || 
|-id=113 bgcolor=#E9E9E9
| 496113 ||  || — || November 21, 2009 || Kitt Peak || Spacewatch ||  || align=right | 2.2 km || 
|-id=114 bgcolor=#FA8072
| 496114 ||  || — || November 17, 2009 || Mount Lemmon || Mount Lemmon Survey ||  || align=right | 2.3 km || 
|-id=115 bgcolor=#E9E9E9
| 496115 ||  || — || November 11, 2009 || Kitt Peak || Spacewatch || MRX || align=right | 1.5 km || 
|-id=116 bgcolor=#E9E9E9
| 496116 ||  || — || November 24, 2009 || Kitt Peak || Spacewatch ||  || align=right | 2.5 km || 
|-id=117 bgcolor=#E9E9E9
| 496117 ||  || — || November 9, 2009 || Kitt Peak || Spacewatch ||  || align=right | 2.1 km || 
|-id=118 bgcolor=#d6d6d6
| 496118 ||  || — || December 19, 2009 || Mount Lemmon || Mount Lemmon Survey ||  || align=right | 3.2 km || 
|-id=119 bgcolor=#d6d6d6
| 496119 ||  || — || January 12, 2010 || Catalina || CSS ||  || align=right | 2.4 km || 
|-id=120 bgcolor=#d6d6d6
| 496120 ||  || — || August 29, 2006 || Anderson Mesa || LONEOS ||  || align=right | 5.9 km || 
|-id=121 bgcolor=#d6d6d6
| 496121 ||  || — || February 14, 2010 || Haleakala || Pan-STARRS ||  || align=right | 2.9 km || 
|-id=122 bgcolor=#d6d6d6
| 496122 ||  || — || November 1, 2008 || Mount Lemmon || Mount Lemmon Survey || HYG || align=right | 2.8 km || 
|-id=123 bgcolor=#d6d6d6
| 496123 ||  || — || February 10, 2010 || WISE || WISE ||  || align=right | 4.6 km || 
|-id=124 bgcolor=#FFC2E0
| 496124 ||  || — || March 8, 2010 || Siding Spring || SSS || AMO +1km || align=right data-sort-value="0.97" | 970 m || 
|-id=125 bgcolor=#d6d6d6
| 496125 ||  || — || March 21, 2010 || Mount Lemmon || Mount Lemmon Survey ||  || align=right | 2.9 km || 
|-id=126 bgcolor=#fefefe
| 496126 ||  || — || April 8, 2010 || Kitt Peak || Spacewatch ||  || align=right data-sort-value="0.61" | 610 m || 
|-id=127 bgcolor=#FA8072
| 496127 ||  || — || March 19, 2010 || Mount Lemmon || Mount Lemmon Survey ||  || align=right data-sort-value="0.80" | 800 m || 
|-id=128 bgcolor=#fefefe
| 496128 ||  || — || June 2, 2010 || WISE || WISE ||  || align=right | 1.2 km || 
|-id=129 bgcolor=#d6d6d6
| 496129 ||  || — || June 29, 2010 || WISE || WISE ||  || align=right | 3.0 km || 
|-id=130 bgcolor=#fefefe
| 496130 ||  || — || October 15, 1999 || Socorro || LINEAR || CHL || align=right | 1.6 km || 
|-id=131 bgcolor=#E9E9E9
| 496131 ||  || — || January 9, 1999 || Kitt Peak || Spacewatch ||  || align=right | 2.0 km || 
|-id=132 bgcolor=#fefefe
| 496132 ||  || — || July 17, 2010 || La Sagra || OAM Obs. ||  || align=right data-sort-value="0.81" | 810 m || 
|-id=133 bgcolor=#E9E9E9
| 496133 ||  || — || October 16, 2006 || Catalina || CSS ||  || align=right | 1.9 km || 
|-id=134 bgcolor=#fefefe
| 496134 ||  || — || August 13, 2010 || Kitt Peak || Spacewatch || NYS || align=right data-sort-value="0.60" | 600 m || 
|-id=135 bgcolor=#fefefe
| 496135 ||  || — || November 7, 2007 || Kitt Peak || Spacewatch ||  || align=right data-sort-value="0.89" | 890 m || 
|-id=136 bgcolor=#fefefe
| 496136 ||  || — || September 6, 2010 || Kitt Peak || Spacewatch ||  || align=right data-sort-value="0.81" | 810 m || 
|-id=137 bgcolor=#fefefe
| 496137 ||  || — || September 6, 2010 || La Sagra || OAM Obs. || NYS || align=right data-sort-value="0.60" | 600 m || 
|-id=138 bgcolor=#fefefe
| 496138 ||  || — || November 18, 2003 || Kitt Peak || Spacewatch ||  || align=right data-sort-value="0.62" | 620 m || 
|-id=139 bgcolor=#fefefe
| 496139 ||  || — || May 25, 2006 || Mount Lemmon || Mount Lemmon Survey || MAS || align=right data-sort-value="0.77" | 770 m || 
|-id=140 bgcolor=#fefefe
| 496140 ||  || — || December 31, 2007 || Mount Lemmon || Mount Lemmon Survey ||  || align=right data-sort-value="0.68" | 680 m || 
|-id=141 bgcolor=#fefefe
| 496141 ||  || — || November 20, 2003 || Kitt Peak || Spacewatch ||  || align=right data-sort-value="0.70" | 700 m || 
|-id=142 bgcolor=#fefefe
| 496142 ||  || — || August 7, 1999 || Kitt Peak || Spacewatch ||  || align=right data-sort-value="0.60" | 600 m || 
|-id=143 bgcolor=#fefefe
| 496143 ||  || — || September 26, 1995 || Kitt Peak || Spacewatch ||  || align=right data-sort-value="0.71" | 710 m || 
|-id=144 bgcolor=#fefefe
| 496144 ||  || — || September 9, 2010 || La Sagra || OAM Obs. ||  || align=right data-sort-value="0.62" | 620 m || 
|-id=145 bgcolor=#fefefe
| 496145 ||  || — || September 11, 2010 || La Sagra || OAM Obs. ||  || align=right data-sort-value="0.76" | 760 m || 
|-id=146 bgcolor=#fefefe
| 496146 ||  || — || June 14, 2010 || WISE || WISE ||  || align=right data-sort-value="0.72" | 720 m || 
|-id=147 bgcolor=#d6d6d6
| 496147 ||  || — || September 2, 2010 || Mount Lemmon || Mount Lemmon Survey || VER || align=right | 2.3 km || 
|-id=148 bgcolor=#fefefe
| 496148 ||  || — || September 9, 2010 || Kitt Peak || Spacewatch || NYS || align=right data-sort-value="0.60" | 600 m || 
|-id=149 bgcolor=#fefefe
| 496149 ||  || — || November 11, 2007 || Mount Lemmon || Mount Lemmon Survey || NYS || align=right data-sort-value="0.91" | 910 m || 
|-id=150 bgcolor=#d6d6d6
| 496150 ||  || — || September 18, 2010 || Kitt Peak || Spacewatch || TIR || align=right | 2.3 km || 
|-id=151 bgcolor=#fefefe
| 496151 ||  || — || March 17, 2009 || Kitt Peak || Spacewatch || H || align=right data-sort-value="0.71" | 710 m || 
|-id=152 bgcolor=#fefefe
| 496152 ||  || — || September 30, 2010 || Mount Lemmon || Mount Lemmon Survey ||  || align=right data-sort-value="0.82" | 820 m || 
|-id=153 bgcolor=#E9E9E9
| 496153 ||  || — || October 28, 2010 || Kitt Peak || Spacewatch ||  || align=right | 1.0 km || 
|-id=154 bgcolor=#E9E9E9
| 496154 ||  || — || October 12, 2010 || Mount Lemmon || Mount Lemmon Survey ||  || align=right | 1.3 km || 
|-id=155 bgcolor=#E9E9E9
| 496155 ||  || — || December 1, 2006 || Catalina || CSS || BAR || align=right | 2.4 km || 
|-id=156 bgcolor=#E9E9E9
| 496156 ||  || — || November 3, 2010 || Kitt Peak || Spacewatch || BAR || align=right | 2.5 km || 
|-id=157 bgcolor=#E9E9E9
| 496157 ||  || — || November 23, 2006 || Mount Lemmon || Mount Lemmon Survey || BRU || align=right | 1.1 km || 
|-id=158 bgcolor=#E9E9E9
| 496158 ||  || — || October 13, 2010 || Mount Lemmon || Mount Lemmon Survey ||  || align=right | 1.7 km || 
|-id=159 bgcolor=#E9E9E9
| 496159 ||  || — || November 25, 2006 || Kitt Peak || Spacewatch ||  || align=right data-sort-value="0.68" | 680 m || 
|-id=160 bgcolor=#E9E9E9
| 496160 ||  || — || December 16, 2006 || Kitt Peak || Spacewatch ||  || align=right data-sort-value="0.77" | 770 m || 
|-id=161 bgcolor=#E9E9E9
| 496161 ||  || — || November 23, 2006 || Kitt Peak || Spacewatch ||  || align=right data-sort-value="0.56" | 560 m || 
|-id=162 bgcolor=#d6d6d6
| 496162 ||  || — || October 9, 2010 || Mount Lemmon || Mount Lemmon Survey ||  || align=right | 2.7 km || 
|-id=163 bgcolor=#fefefe
| 496163 ||  || — || October 1, 2003 || Kitt Peak || Spacewatch ||  || align=right data-sort-value="0.69" | 690 m || 
|-id=164 bgcolor=#FA8072
| 496164 ||  || — || June 18, 2006 || Kitt Peak || Spacewatch ||  || align=right data-sort-value="0.56" | 560 m || 
|-id=165 bgcolor=#fefefe
| 496165 ||  || — || October 17, 2006 || Kitt Peak || Spacewatch || SVE || align=right data-sort-value="0.94" | 940 m || 
|-id=166 bgcolor=#C2FFFF
| 496166 ||  || — || November 29, 1997 || Kitt Peak || Spacewatch || L4 || align=right | 8.2 km || 
|-id=167 bgcolor=#fefefe
| 496167 ||  || — || November 2, 2010 || Kitt Peak || Spacewatch || LCI || align=right data-sort-value="0.97" | 970 m || 
|-id=168 bgcolor=#C2FFFF
| 496168 ||  || — || December 13, 2010 || Kitt Peak || Spacewatch || L4 || align=right | 7.3 km || 
|-id=169 bgcolor=#fefefe
| 496169 ||  || — || December 5, 2010 || Mount Lemmon || Mount Lemmon Survey || H || align=right data-sort-value="0.65" | 650 m || 
|-id=170 bgcolor=#E9E9E9
| 496170 ||  || — || December 30, 2005 || Kitt Peak || Spacewatch ||  || align=right | 2.7 km || 
|-id=171 bgcolor=#fefefe
| 496171 ||  || — || November 5, 2010 || Kitt Peak || Spacewatch || H || align=right data-sort-value="0.86" | 860 m || 
|-id=172 bgcolor=#E9E9E9
| 496172 ||  || — || January 30, 2011 || Haleakala || Pan-STARRS || AGN || align=right | 1.7 km || 
|-id=173 bgcolor=#E9E9E9
| 496173 ||  || — || January 30, 2011 || Haleakala || Pan-STARRS ||  || align=right | 1.3 km || 
|-id=174 bgcolor=#FFC2E0
| 496174 ||  || — || February 1, 2011 || Haleakala || Pan-STARRS || APOslow? || align=right data-sort-value="0.66" | 660 m || 
|-id=175 bgcolor=#E9E9E9
| 496175 ||  || — || January 28, 2011 || Mount Lemmon || Mount Lemmon Survey ||  || align=right | 2.5 km || 
|-id=176 bgcolor=#E9E9E9
| 496176 ||  || — || January 30, 2011 || Haleakala || Pan-STARRS || WIT || align=right | 1.8 km || 
|-id=177 bgcolor=#FA8072
| 496177 ||  || — || December 13, 2010 || Catalina || CSS || Tj (2.94) || align=right | 3.8 km || 
|-id=178 bgcolor=#E9E9E9
| 496178 ||  || — || October 23, 2009 || Mount Lemmon || Mount Lemmon Survey || AGN || align=right | 1.6 km || 
|-id=179 bgcolor=#d6d6d6
| 496179 ||  || — || January 31, 2006 || Kitt Peak || Spacewatch ||  || align=right | 1.9 km || 
|-id=180 bgcolor=#E9E9E9
| 496180 ||  || — || January 30, 2011 || Haleakala || Pan-STARRS ||  || align=right | 1.8 km || 
|-id=181 bgcolor=#E9E9E9
| 496181 ||  || — || January 30, 2011 || Haleakala || Pan-STARRS ||  || align=right | 1.7 km || 
|-id=182 bgcolor=#E9E9E9
| 496182 ||  || — || January 22, 2006 || Mount Lemmon || Mount Lemmon Survey ||  || align=right | 1.6 km || 
|-id=183 bgcolor=#E9E9E9
| 496183 ||  || — || January 30, 2011 || Haleakala || Pan-STARRS ||  || align=right | 2.8 km || 
|-id=184 bgcolor=#E9E9E9
| 496184 ||  || — || January 30, 2011 || Haleakala || Pan-STARRS ||  || align=right | 1.4 km || 
|-id=185 bgcolor=#E9E9E9
| 496185 ||  || — || December 1, 2005 || Kitt Peak || Spacewatch ||  || align=right | 1.9 km || 
|-id=186 bgcolor=#d6d6d6
| 496186 ||  || — || March 26, 2011 || Kitt Peak || Spacewatch ||  || align=right | 2.2 km || 
|-id=187 bgcolor=#d6d6d6
| 496187 ||  || — || March 29, 2000 || Kitt Peak || Spacewatch ||  || align=right | 2.1 km || 
|-id=188 bgcolor=#d6d6d6
| 496188 ||  || — || February 1, 2005 || Kitt Peak || Spacewatch ||  || align=right | 5.3 km || 
|-id=189 bgcolor=#d6d6d6
| 496189 ||  || — || October 7, 2007 || Mount Lemmon || Mount Lemmon Survey || TIR || align=right | 2.6 km || 
|-id=190 bgcolor=#d6d6d6
| 496190 ||  || — || April 11, 2011 || Mount Lemmon || Mount Lemmon Survey ||  || align=right | 2.5 km || 
|-id=191 bgcolor=#d6d6d6
| 496191 ||  || — || April 3, 2011 || Haleakala || Pan-STARRS ||  || align=right | 2.1 km || 
|-id=192 bgcolor=#d6d6d6
| 496192 ||  || — || April 26, 2011 || Kitt Peak || Spacewatch ||  || align=right | 3.2 km || 
|-id=193 bgcolor=#d6d6d6
| 496193 ||  || — || May 2, 2006 || Mount Lemmon || Mount Lemmon Survey ||  || align=right | 2.4 km || 
|-id=194 bgcolor=#d6d6d6
| 496194 ||  || — || April 30, 2011 || Haleakala || Pan-STARRS ||  || align=right | 2.9 km || 
|-id=195 bgcolor=#d6d6d6
| 496195 ||  || — || January 12, 2010 || Mount Lemmon || Mount Lemmon Survey || EOS || align=right | 3.2 km || 
|-id=196 bgcolor=#E9E9E9
| 496196 ||  || — || April 28, 2011 || Haleakala || Pan-STARRS || WAT || align=right | 3.4 km || 
|-id=197 bgcolor=#d6d6d6
| 496197 ||  || — || April 28, 2011 || Haleakala || Pan-STARRS ||  || align=right | 2.9 km || 
|-id=198 bgcolor=#d6d6d6
| 496198 ||  || — || April 30, 2011 || Kitt Peak || Spacewatch ||  || align=right | 3.0 km || 
|-id=199 bgcolor=#d6d6d6
| 496199 ||  || — || December 31, 2008 || Mount Lemmon || Mount Lemmon Survey ||  || align=right | 2.9 km || 
|-id=200 bgcolor=#d6d6d6
| 496200 ||  || — || April 27, 2011 || Kitt Peak || Spacewatch ||  || align=right | 2.3 km || 
|}

496201–496300 

|-bgcolor=#d6d6d6
| 496201 ||  || — || May 1, 2011 || Haleakala || Pan-STARRS ||  || align=right | 3.2 km || 
|-id=202 bgcolor=#d6d6d6
| 496202 ||  || — || April 30, 2011 || Haleakala || Pan-STARRS ||  || align=right | 2.7 km || 
|-id=203 bgcolor=#d6d6d6
| 496203 ||  || — || May 21, 2011 || Haleakala || Pan-STARRS || EOS || align=right | 3.5 km || 
|-id=204 bgcolor=#E9E9E9
| 496204 ||  || — || September 2, 2011 || Haleakala || Pan-STARRS || WIT || align=right | 1.8 km || 
|-id=205 bgcolor=#d6d6d6
| 496205 ||  || — || September 4, 2011 || Haleakala || Pan-STARRS ||  || align=right | 2.6 km || 
|-id=206 bgcolor=#d6d6d6
| 496206 ||  || — || September 8, 2011 || Kitt Peak || Spacewatch ||  || align=right | 2.8 km || 
|-id=207 bgcolor=#E9E9E9
| 496207 ||  || — || October 8, 2007 || Kitt Peak || Spacewatch ||  || align=right data-sort-value="0.71" | 710 m || 
|-id=208 bgcolor=#fefefe
| 496208 ||  || — || June 14, 2011 || Mount Lemmon || Mount Lemmon Survey || critical || align=right data-sort-value="0.68" | 680 m || 
|-id=209 bgcolor=#d6d6d6
| 496209 ||  || — || September 4, 2011 || Haleakala || Pan-STARRS ||  || align=right | 2.4 km || 
|-id=210 bgcolor=#fefefe
| 496210 ||  || — || November 15, 1998 || Kitt Peak || Spacewatch ||  || align=right data-sort-value="0.47" | 470 m || 
|-id=211 bgcolor=#fefefe
| 496211 ||  || — || October 19, 2011 || Kitt Peak || Spacewatch ||  || align=right data-sort-value="0.69" | 690 m || 
|-id=212 bgcolor=#fefefe
| 496212 ||  || — || December 31, 2008 || Kitt Peak || Spacewatch ||  || align=right data-sort-value="0.45" | 450 m || 
|-id=213 bgcolor=#E9E9E9
| 496213 ||  || — || August 21, 2006 || Kitt Peak || Spacewatch || WIT || align=right | 1.6 km || 
|-id=214 bgcolor=#FA8072
| 496214 ||  || — || September 23, 2011 || Mount Lemmon || Mount Lemmon Survey ||  || align=right data-sort-value="0.55" | 550 m || 
|-id=215 bgcolor=#fefefe
| 496215 ||  || — || September 23, 2011 || Mount Lemmon || Mount Lemmon Survey ||  || align=right data-sort-value="0.45" | 450 m || 
|-id=216 bgcolor=#d6d6d6
| 496216 ||  || — || October 22, 2011 || Kitt Peak || Spacewatch ||  || align=right | 2.4 km || 
|-id=217 bgcolor=#d6d6d6
| 496217 ||  || — || October 21, 2011 || Kitt Peak || Spacewatch ||  || align=right | 2.2 km || 
|-id=218 bgcolor=#d6d6d6
| 496218 ||  || — || December 15, 2006 || Kitt Peak || Spacewatch ||  || align=right | 1.8 km || 
|-id=219 bgcolor=#fefefe
| 496219 ||  || — || October 26, 2011 || Haleakala || Pan-STARRS ||  || align=right data-sort-value="0.56" | 560 m || 
|-id=220 bgcolor=#E9E9E9
| 496220 ||  || — || January 18, 2008 || Kitt Peak || Spacewatch ||  || align=right | 1.4 km || 
|-id=221 bgcolor=#fefefe
| 496221 ||  || — || April 9, 2010 || Mount Lemmon || Mount Lemmon Survey ||  || align=right data-sort-value="0.65" | 650 m || 
|-id=222 bgcolor=#fefefe
| 496222 ||  || — || November 25, 2011 || Haleakala || Pan-STARRS ||  || align=right data-sort-value="0.55" | 550 m || 
|-id=223 bgcolor=#fefefe
| 496223 ||  || — || August 22, 2004 || Kitt Peak || Spacewatch ||  || align=right data-sort-value="0.58" | 580 m || 
|-id=224 bgcolor=#fefefe
| 496224 ||  || — || October 26, 2011 || Haleakala || Pan-STARRS ||  || align=right data-sort-value="0.75" | 750 m || 
|-id=225 bgcolor=#d6d6d6
| 496225 ||  || — || October 26, 2011 || Haleakala || Pan-STARRS || THM || align=right | 1.9 km || 
|-id=226 bgcolor=#E9E9E9
| 496226 ||  || — || December 25, 2011 || Mount Lemmon || Mount Lemmon Survey ||  || align=right | 1.6 km || 
|-id=227 bgcolor=#fefefe
| 496227 ||  || — || January 19, 2012 || Mount Lemmon || Mount Lemmon Survey ||  || align=right data-sort-value="0.77" | 770 m || 
|-id=228 bgcolor=#d6d6d6
| 496228 ||  || — || May 3, 2008 || Kitt Peak || Spacewatch || EOS || align=right | 2.5 km || 
|-id=229 bgcolor=#fefefe
| 496229 ||  || — || January 26, 2012 || Haleakala || Pan-STARRS ||  || align=right data-sort-value="0.65" | 650 m || 
|-id=230 bgcolor=#FFC2E0
| 496230 ||  || — || February 1, 2012 || Mount Lemmon || Mount Lemmon Survey || AMOcritical || align=right data-sort-value="0.78" | 780 m || 
|-id=231 bgcolor=#fefefe
| 496231 ||  || — || February 3, 2012 || Haleakala || Pan-STARRS || NYS || align=right data-sort-value="0.54" | 540 m || 
|-id=232 bgcolor=#fefefe
| 496232 ||  || — || February 13, 2012 || Haleakala || Pan-STARRS ||  || align=right data-sort-value="0.65" | 650 m || 
|-id=233 bgcolor=#E9E9E9
| 496233 ||  || — || March 4, 2008 || Mount Lemmon || Mount Lemmon Survey || HNS || align=right | 1.2 km || 
|-id=234 bgcolor=#E9E9E9
| 496234 ||  || — || February 18, 2012 || Catalina || CSS ||  || align=right | 2.3 km || 
|-id=235 bgcolor=#E9E9E9
| 496235 ||  || — || February 23, 2012 || Kitt Peak || Spacewatch ||  || align=right | 2.0 km || 
|-id=236 bgcolor=#E9E9E9
| 496236 ||  || — || March 14, 2012 || Catalina || CSS || CLO || align=right | 2.1 km || 
|-id=237 bgcolor=#E9E9E9
| 496237 ||  || — || September 16, 2009 || Mount Lemmon || Mount Lemmon Survey ||  || align=right | 1.7 km || 
|-id=238 bgcolor=#d6d6d6
| 496238 ||  || — || October 8, 2004 || Kitt Peak || Spacewatch || THM || align=right | 1.9 km || 
|-id=239 bgcolor=#E9E9E9
| 496239 ||  || — || December 6, 2011 || Haleakala || Pan-STARRS ||  || align=right | 1.7 km || 
|-id=240 bgcolor=#E9E9E9
| 496240 ||  || — || March 17, 2012 || Catalina || CSS ||  || align=right | 1.9 km || 
|-id=241 bgcolor=#E9E9E9
| 496241 ||  || — || February 23, 2012 || Mount Lemmon || Mount Lemmon Survey ||  || align=right | 1.7 km || 
|-id=242 bgcolor=#E9E9E9
| 496242 ||  || — || April 15, 2012 || Haleakala || Pan-STARRS || EUN || align=right | 1.0 km || 
|-id=243 bgcolor=#E9E9E9
| 496243 ||  || — || October 28, 2005 || Kitt Peak || Spacewatch ||  || align=right | 1.5 km || 
|-id=244 bgcolor=#E9E9E9
| 496244 ||  || — || April 19, 2012 || Mount Lemmon || Mount Lemmon Survey ||  || align=right | 1.3 km || 
|-id=245 bgcolor=#E9E9E9
| 496245 ||  || — || April 15, 2012 || Haleakala || Pan-STARRS ||  || align=right | 2.3 km || 
|-id=246 bgcolor=#E9E9E9
| 496246 ||  || — || January 30, 2012 || Haleakala || Pan-STARRS ||  || align=right | 1.5 km || 
|-id=247 bgcolor=#E9E9E9
| 496247 ||  || — || April 15, 2012 || Haleakala || Pan-STARRS ||  || align=right | 2.0 km || 
|-id=248 bgcolor=#d6d6d6
| 496248 ||  || — || April 24, 2012 || Haleakala || Pan-STARRS ||  || align=right | 2.2 km || 
|-id=249 bgcolor=#E9E9E9
| 496249 ||  || — || April 27, 2012 || Haleakala || Pan-STARRS ||  || align=right | 1.2 km || 
|-id=250 bgcolor=#E9E9E9
| 496250 ||  || — || March 27, 2012 || Kitt Peak || Spacewatch ||  || align=right | 2.3 km || 
|-id=251 bgcolor=#E9E9E9
| 496251 ||  || — || May 9, 2012 || Haleakala || Pan-STARRS ||  || align=right | 3.3 km || 
|-id=252 bgcolor=#d6d6d6
| 496252 ||  || — || January 30, 2011 || Haleakala || Pan-STARRS || KOR || align=right | 1.9 km || 
|-id=253 bgcolor=#E9E9E9
| 496253 ||  || — || October 23, 2009 || Mount Lemmon || Mount Lemmon Survey ||  || align=right | 1.9 km || 
|-id=254 bgcolor=#E9E9E9
| 496254 ||  || — || January 30, 2011 || Haleakala || Pan-STARRS ||  || align=right | 1.6 km || 
|-id=255 bgcolor=#d6d6d6
| 496255 ||  || — || May 17, 2012 || Mount Lemmon || Mount Lemmon Survey || TIR || align=right | 3.1 km || 
|-id=256 bgcolor=#d6d6d6
| 496256 ||  || — || December 1, 2008 || Kitt Peak || Spacewatch || VER || align=right | 2.9 km || 
|-id=257 bgcolor=#fefefe
| 496257 ||  || — || May 19, 2012 || Mount Lemmon || Mount Lemmon Survey || H || align=right data-sort-value="0.56" | 560 m || 
|-id=258 bgcolor=#d6d6d6
| 496258 ||  || — || October 30, 2007 || Mount Lemmon || Mount Lemmon Survey || HYG || align=right | 2.6 km || 
|-id=259 bgcolor=#fefefe
| 496259 ||  || — || February 17, 2004 || Kitt Peak || Spacewatch || H || align=right data-sort-value="0.59" | 590 m || 
|-id=260 bgcolor=#d6d6d6
| 496260 ||  || — || August 6, 2012 || Haleakala || Pan-STARRS ||  || align=right | 2.9 km || 
|-id=261 bgcolor=#d6d6d6
| 496261 ||  || — || August 13, 2012 || Haleakala || Pan-STARRS || TEL || align=right | 3.0 km || 
|-id=262 bgcolor=#d6d6d6
| 496262 ||  || — || April 3, 2011 || Haleakala || Pan-STARRS ||  || align=right | 2.4 km || 
|-id=263 bgcolor=#d6d6d6
| 496263 ||  || — || August 14, 2012 || Kitt Peak || Spacewatch || TIR || align=right | 3.4 km || 
|-id=264 bgcolor=#d6d6d6
| 496264 ||  || — || August 24, 2012 || Catalina || CSS ||  || align=right | 3.0 km || 
|-id=265 bgcolor=#d6d6d6
| 496265 ||  || — || May 31, 2011 || Kitt Peak || Spacewatch || THB || align=right | 3.5 km || 
|-id=266 bgcolor=#E9E9E9
| 496266 ||  || — || April 3, 2011 || Haleakala || Pan-STARRS ||  || align=right | 1.2 km || 
|-id=267 bgcolor=#d6d6d6
| 496267 ||  || — || August 26, 2012 || Haleakala || Pan-STARRS || URS || align=right | 2.5 km || 
|-id=268 bgcolor=#d6d6d6
| 496268 ||  || — || April 22, 2004 || Kitt Peak || Spacewatch || VER || align=right | 4.0 km || 
|-id=269 bgcolor=#d6d6d6
| 496269 ||  || — || November 15, 2007 || Catalina || CSS ||  || align=right | 2.5 km || 
|-id=270 bgcolor=#d6d6d6
| 496270 ||  || — || October 9, 2007 || Mount Lemmon || Mount Lemmon Survey ||  || align=right | 2.2 km || 
|-id=271 bgcolor=#d6d6d6
| 496271 ||  || — || October 14, 2007 || Mount Lemmon || Mount Lemmon Survey ||  || align=right | 2.5 km || 
|-id=272 bgcolor=#d6d6d6
| 496272 ||  || — || November 1, 2007 || Kitt Peak || Spacewatch || THM || align=right | 2.5 km || 
|-id=273 bgcolor=#d6d6d6
| 496273 ||  || — || September 16, 2012 || Catalina || CSS || criticalTj (2.96) || align=right | 3.5 km || 
|-id=274 bgcolor=#d6d6d6
| 496274 ||  || — || October 15, 2007 || Kitt Peak || Spacewatch ||  || align=right | 2.4 km || 
|-id=275 bgcolor=#fefefe
| 496275 ||  || — || October 8, 2012 || Catalina || CSS || H || align=right data-sort-value="0.81" | 810 m || 
|-id=276 bgcolor=#fefefe
| 496276 ||  || — || September 14, 2012 || Mount Lemmon || Mount Lemmon Survey || H || align=right data-sort-value="0.62" | 620 m || 
|-id=277 bgcolor=#d6d6d6
| 496277 ||  || — || September 25, 2012 || Mount Lemmon || Mount Lemmon Survey || EOS || align=right | 2.5 km || 
|-id=278 bgcolor=#d6d6d6
| 496278 ||  || — || October 11, 2012 || Mount Lemmon || Mount Lemmon Survey || HYG || align=right | 2.6 km || 
|-id=279 bgcolor=#d6d6d6
| 496279 ||  || — || September 28, 2006 || Catalina || CSS ||  || align=right | 3.3 km || 
|-id=280 bgcolor=#d6d6d6
| 496280 ||  || — || December 5, 2007 || Kitt Peak || Spacewatch || HYG || align=right | 2.7 km || 
|-id=281 bgcolor=#d6d6d6
| 496281 ||  || — || September 15, 2006 || Kitt Peak || Spacewatch || Tj (2.98) || align=right | 3.0 km || 
|-id=282 bgcolor=#E9E9E9
| 496282 ||  || — || November 18, 2008 || Kitt Peak || Spacewatch ||  || align=right data-sort-value="0.75" | 750 m || 
|-id=283 bgcolor=#fefefe
| 496283 ||  || — || November 26, 2005 || Mount Lemmon || Mount Lemmon Survey ||  || align=right data-sort-value="0.65" | 650 m || 
|-id=284 bgcolor=#fefefe
| 496284 ||  || — || October 20, 2012 || Haleakala || Pan-STARRS || H || align=right data-sort-value="0.62" | 620 m || 
|-id=285 bgcolor=#d6d6d6
| 496285 ||  || — || November 14, 2012 || Kitt Peak || Spacewatch || 7:4 || align=right | 3.0 km || 
|-id=286 bgcolor=#fefefe
| 496286 ||  || — || July 27, 2011 || Haleakala || Pan-STARRS ||  || align=right | 1.1 km || 
|-id=287 bgcolor=#d6d6d6
| 496287 ||  || — || November 18, 2007 || Mount Lemmon || Mount Lemmon Survey ||  || align=right | 1.8 km || 
|-id=288 bgcolor=#d6d6d6
| 496288 ||  || — || November 16, 2006 || Mount Lemmon || Mount Lemmon Survey ||  || align=right | 3.2 km || 
|-id=289 bgcolor=#d6d6d6
| 496289 ||  || — || November 7, 2012 || Haleakala || Pan-STARRS || 3:2 || align=right | 2.9 km || 
|-id=290 bgcolor=#fefefe
| 496290 ||  || — || June 2, 2011 || Haleakala || Pan-STARRS || H || align=right data-sort-value="0.84" | 840 m || 
|-id=291 bgcolor=#E9E9E9
| 496291 ||  || — || October 14, 2007 || Mount Lemmon || Mount Lemmon Survey ||  || align=right | 2.1 km || 
|-id=292 bgcolor=#E9E9E9
| 496292 ||  || — || September 24, 2011 || Haleakala || Pan-STARRS ||  || align=right | 2.2 km || 
|-id=293 bgcolor=#C2FFFF
| 496293 ||  || — || December 8, 2012 || Kitt Peak || Spacewatch || L4 || align=right | 12 km || 
|-id=294 bgcolor=#fefefe
| 496294 ||  || — || July 26, 2011 || Haleakala || Pan-STARRS ||  || align=right data-sort-value="0.99" | 990 m || 
|-id=295 bgcolor=#d6d6d6
| 496295 ||  || — || October 23, 2006 || Catalina || CSS ||  || align=right | 5.3 km || 
|-id=296 bgcolor=#fefefe
| 496296 ||  || — || January 10, 2013 || Haleakala || Pan-STARRS ||  || align=right data-sort-value="0.65" | 650 m || 
|-id=297 bgcolor=#d6d6d6
| 496297 ||  || — || September 25, 2011 || Haleakala || Pan-STARRS ||  || align=right | 2.3 km || 
|-id=298 bgcolor=#d6d6d6
| 496298 ||  || — || January 14, 2002 || Kitt Peak || Spacewatch ||  || align=right | 2.3 km || 
|-id=299 bgcolor=#fefefe
| 496299 ||  || — || January 19, 2013 || Mount Lemmon || Mount Lemmon Survey ||  || align=right data-sort-value="0.66" | 660 m || 
|-id=300 bgcolor=#C2FFFF
| 496300 ||  || — || September 6, 2008 || Mount Lemmon || Mount Lemmon Survey || L4ERY || align=right | 6.3 km || 
|}

496301–496400 

|-bgcolor=#fefefe
| 496301 ||  || — || February 7, 2013 || Kitt Peak || Spacewatch ||  || align=right data-sort-value="0.61" | 610 m || 
|-id=302 bgcolor=#C2FFFF
| 496302 ||  || — || September 13, 2007 || Mount Lemmon || Mount Lemmon Survey || L4 || align=right | 7.6 km || 
|-id=303 bgcolor=#fefefe
| 496303 ||  || — || September 4, 2011 || Haleakala || Pan-STARRS ||  || align=right data-sort-value="0.62" | 620 m || 
|-id=304 bgcolor=#fefefe
| 496304 ||  || — || July 4, 2010 || Kitt Peak || Spacewatch || NYS || align=right data-sort-value="0.60" | 600 m || 
|-id=305 bgcolor=#fefefe
| 496305 ||  || — || March 23, 2006 || Kitt Peak || Spacewatch ||  || align=right data-sort-value="0.65" | 650 m || 
|-id=306 bgcolor=#fefefe
| 496306 ||  || — || January 9, 2002 || Cima Ekar || ADAS ||  || align=right data-sort-value="0.74" | 740 m || 
|-id=307 bgcolor=#fefefe
| 496307 ||  || — || January 16, 2009 || Mount Lemmon || Mount Lemmon Survey ||  || align=right data-sort-value="0.76" | 760 m || 
|-id=308 bgcolor=#fefefe
| 496308 ||  || — || December 30, 2008 || Kitt Peak || Spacewatch ||  || align=right data-sort-value="0.61" | 610 m || 
|-id=309 bgcolor=#fefefe
| 496309 ||  || — || November 24, 2011 || Haleakala || Pan-STARRS ||  || align=right data-sort-value="0.73" | 730 m || 
|-id=310 bgcolor=#fefefe
| 496310 ||  || — || March 24, 2006 || Kitt Peak || Spacewatch ||  || align=right data-sort-value="0.85" | 850 m || 
|-id=311 bgcolor=#fefefe
| 496311 ||  || — || April 10, 2013 || Haleakala || Pan-STARRS ||  || align=right data-sort-value="0.72" | 720 m || 
|-id=312 bgcolor=#fefefe
| 496312 ||  || — || March 11, 2013 || Mount Lemmon || Mount Lemmon Survey ||  || align=right data-sort-value="0.66" | 660 m || 
|-id=313 bgcolor=#fefefe
| 496313 ||  || — || April 8, 2013 || Mount Lemmon || Mount Lemmon Survey ||  || align=right data-sort-value="0.79" | 790 m || 
|-id=314 bgcolor=#fefefe
| 496314 ||  || — || March 16, 2013 || Mount Lemmon || Mount Lemmon Survey ||  || align=right data-sort-value="0.70" | 700 m || 
|-id=315 bgcolor=#C2E0FF
| 496315 ||  || — || February 8, 2013 || Mauna Kea || OSSOS || SDO || align=right | 212 km || 
|-id=316 bgcolor=#FA8072
| 496316 ||  || — || November 25, 2011 || Haleakala || Pan-STARRS ||  || align=right data-sort-value="0.85" | 850 m || 
|-id=317 bgcolor=#fefefe
| 496317 ||  || — || November 29, 2011 || Kitt Peak || Spacewatch ||  || align=right data-sort-value="0.67" | 670 m || 
|-id=318 bgcolor=#fefefe
| 496318 ||  || — || May 20, 2006 || Kitt Peak || Spacewatch ||  || align=right data-sort-value="0.63" | 630 m || 
|-id=319 bgcolor=#fefefe
| 496319 ||  || — || January 5, 2006 || Kitt Peak || Spacewatch ||  || align=right data-sort-value="0.48" | 480 m || 
|-id=320 bgcolor=#fefefe
| 496320 ||  || — || September 22, 2003 || Kitt Peak || Spacewatch || MAS || align=right data-sort-value="0.50" | 500 m || 
|-id=321 bgcolor=#fefefe
| 496321 ||  || — || October 26, 2011 || Haleakala || Pan-STARRS ||  || align=right data-sort-value="0.78" | 780 m || 
|-id=322 bgcolor=#E9E9E9
| 496322 ||  || — || December 29, 2011 || Mount Lemmon || Mount Lemmon Survey ||  || align=right | 2.0 km || 
|-id=323 bgcolor=#fefefe
| 496323 ||  || — || October 1, 2010 || Mount Lemmon || Mount Lemmon Survey || MAS || align=right data-sort-value="0.63" | 630 m || 
|-id=324 bgcolor=#FA8072
| 496324 ||  || — || May 16, 2013 || Haleakala || Pan-STARRS ||  || align=right | 2.4 km || 
|-id=325 bgcolor=#fefefe
| 496325 ||  || — || September 16, 2006 || Catalina || CSS || CHL || align=right data-sort-value="0.66" | 660 m || 
|-id=326 bgcolor=#FFC2E0
| 496326 ||  || — || June 1, 2013 || Mount Lemmon || Mount Lemmon Survey || AMO +1km || align=right | 1.1 km || 
|-id=327 bgcolor=#FFC2E0
| 496327 ||  || — || June 22, 2013 || Haleakala || Pan-STARRS || APO +1km || align=right data-sort-value="0.91" | 910 m || 
|-id=328 bgcolor=#fefefe
| 496328 ||  || — || July 1, 2013 || Haleakala || Pan-STARRS ||  || align=right data-sort-value="0.94" | 940 m || 
|-id=329 bgcolor=#E9E9E9
| 496329 ||  || — || July 11, 2013 || Haleakala || Pan-STARRS ||  || align=right | 1.5 km || 
|-id=330 bgcolor=#E9E9E9
| 496330 ||  || — || January 19, 2012 || Haleakala || Pan-STARRS ||  || align=right | 2.2 km || 
|-id=331 bgcolor=#E9E9E9
| 496331 ||  || — || July 15, 2004 || Siding Spring || SSS || EUN || align=right | 2.0 km || 
|-id=332 bgcolor=#E9E9E9
| 496332 ||  || — || October 27, 2009 || La Sagra || OAM Obs. ||  || align=right | 1.7 km || 
|-id=333 bgcolor=#E9E9E9
| 496333 ||  || — || October 16, 2009 || Catalina || CSS ||  || align=right | 1.4 km || 
|-id=334 bgcolor=#FA8072
| 496334 ||  || — || December 8, 2004 || Socorro || LINEAR ||  || align=right | 2.1 km || 
|-id=335 bgcolor=#E9E9E9
| 496335 ||  || — || January 30, 2011 || Haleakala || Pan-STARRS ||  || align=right | 1.9 km || 
|-id=336 bgcolor=#E9E9E9
| 496336 ||  || — || March 14, 2007 || Mount Lemmon || Mount Lemmon Survey ||  || align=right | 2.7 km || 
|-id=337 bgcolor=#E9E9E9
| 496337 ||  || — || November 25, 2005 || Mount Lemmon || Mount Lemmon Survey || AGN || align=right | 1.1 km || 
|-id=338 bgcolor=#E9E9E9
| 496338 ||  || — || January 30, 2011 || Haleakala || Pan-STARRS || KRM || align=right | 1.6 km || 
|-id=339 bgcolor=#d6d6d6
| 496339 ||  || — || April 12, 2010 || WISE || WISE ||  || align=right | 3.8 km || 
|-id=340 bgcolor=#E9E9E9
| 496340 ||  || — || January 30, 2011 || Haleakala || Pan-STARRS ||  || align=right | 1.5 km || 
|-id=341 bgcolor=#fefefe
| 496341 ||  || — || January 30, 2011 || Haleakala || Pan-STARRS ||  || align=right data-sort-value="0.94" | 940 m || 
|-id=342 bgcolor=#fefefe
| 496342 ||  || — || June 20, 2013 || Haleakala || Pan-STARRS ||  || align=right data-sort-value="0.95" | 950 m || 
|-id=343 bgcolor=#E9E9E9
| 496343 ||  || — || August 18, 2009 || Kitt Peak || Spacewatch ||  || align=right data-sort-value="0.88" | 880 m || 
|-id=344 bgcolor=#E9E9E9
| 496344 ||  || — || April 15, 2012 || Haleakala || Pan-STARRS ||  || align=right | 1.3 km || 
|-id=345 bgcolor=#E9E9E9
| 496345 ||  || — || October 25, 2009 || Kitt Peak || Spacewatch ||  || align=right | 1.8 km || 
|-id=346 bgcolor=#E9E9E9
| 496346 ||  || — || March 16, 2012 || Haleakala || Pan-STARRS ||  || align=right | 1.0 km || 
|-id=347 bgcolor=#E9E9E9
| 496347 ||  || — || February 23, 2003 || Anderson Mesa || LONEOS ||  || align=right | 2.2 km || 
|-id=348 bgcolor=#E9E9E9
| 496348 ||  || — || March 24, 2012 || Mount Lemmon || Mount Lemmon Survey ||  || align=right | 1.5 km || 
|-id=349 bgcolor=#E9E9E9
| 496349 ||  || — || February 25, 2011 || Mount Lemmon || Mount Lemmon Survey ||  || align=right | 2.3 km || 
|-id=350 bgcolor=#E9E9E9
| 496350 ||  || — || February 5, 2011 || Haleakala || Pan-STARRS ||  || align=right | 2.1 km || 
|-id=351 bgcolor=#E9E9E9
| 496351 ||  || — || August 18, 2009 || Kitt Peak || Spacewatch ||  || align=right data-sort-value="0.94" | 940 m || 
|-id=352 bgcolor=#E9E9E9
| 496352 ||  || — || January 30, 2011 || Haleakala || Pan-STARRS ||  || align=right | 2.3 km || 
|-id=353 bgcolor=#E9E9E9
| 496353 ||  || — || December 3, 2005 || Kitt Peak || Spacewatch || EUN || align=right | 1.5 km || 
|-id=354 bgcolor=#E9E9E9
| 496354 ||  || — || May 20, 2013 || Haleakala || Pan-STARRS || EUN || align=right | 1.7 km || 
|-id=355 bgcolor=#d6d6d6
| 496355 ||  || — || July 29, 2008 || Kitt Peak || Spacewatch ||  || align=right | 1.8 km || 
|-id=356 bgcolor=#fefefe
| 496356 ||  || — || February 28, 2012 || Haleakala || Pan-STARRS || MAS || align=right data-sort-value="0.86" | 860 m || 
|-id=357 bgcolor=#fefefe
| 496357 ||  || — || February 15, 2012 || Haleakala || Pan-STARRS ||  || align=right data-sort-value="0.69" | 690 m || 
|-id=358 bgcolor=#E9E9E9
| 496358 ||  || — || September 28, 2009 || Mount Lemmon || Mount Lemmon Survey ||  || align=right | 1.3 km || 
|-id=359 bgcolor=#E9E9E9
| 496359 ||  || — || February 27, 2012 || Haleakala || Pan-STARRS ||  || align=right data-sort-value="0.81" | 810 m || 
|-id=360 bgcolor=#E9E9E9
| 496360 ||  || — || January 30, 2006 || Kitt Peak || Spacewatch ||  || align=right | 2.5 km || 
|-id=361 bgcolor=#E9E9E9
| 496361 ||  || — || January 14, 2011 || Mount Lemmon || Mount Lemmon Survey ||  || align=right | 1.3 km || 
|-id=362 bgcolor=#E9E9E9
| 496362 ||  || — || November 25, 2005 || Mount Lemmon || Mount Lemmon Survey ||  || align=right | 1.3 km || 
|-id=363 bgcolor=#fefefe
| 496363 ||  || — || February 27, 2012 || Haleakala || Pan-STARRS ||  || align=right data-sort-value="0.81" | 810 m || 
|-id=364 bgcolor=#E9E9E9
| 496364 ||  || — || November 10, 2009 || Kitt Peak || Spacewatch || MIS || align=right | 1.2 km || 
|-id=365 bgcolor=#d6d6d6
| 496365 ||  || — || September 2, 2013 || Catalina || CSS || 7:4* || align=right | 4.0 km || 
|-id=366 bgcolor=#d6d6d6
| 496366 ||  || — || March 11, 2005 || Kitt Peak || Spacewatch || EOS || align=right | 2.8 km || 
|-id=367 bgcolor=#d6d6d6
| 496367 ||  || — || August 27, 2008 || La Sagra || OAM Obs. ||  || align=right | 2.5 km || 
|-id=368 bgcolor=#fefefe
| 496368 ||  || — || March 28, 2012 || Mount Lemmon || Mount Lemmon Survey ||  || align=right data-sort-value="0.69" | 690 m || 
|-id=369 bgcolor=#E9E9E9
| 496369 ||  || — || April 2, 2011 || Haleakala || Pan-STARRS || HOF || align=right | 1.7 km || 
|-id=370 bgcolor=#E9E9E9
| 496370 ||  || — || September 2, 2013 || Catalina || CSS ||  || align=right | 1.7 km || 
|-id=371 bgcolor=#E9E9E9
| 496371 ||  || — || November 17, 2009 || Kitt Peak || Spacewatch || WIT || align=right | 1.9 km || 
|-id=372 bgcolor=#E9E9E9
| 496372 ||  || — || October 23, 2009 || Mount Lemmon || Mount Lemmon Survey ||  || align=right | 1.2 km || 
|-id=373 bgcolor=#E9E9E9
| 496373 ||  || — || October 5, 2004 || Kitt Peak || Spacewatch ||  || align=right | 1.6 km || 
|-id=374 bgcolor=#d6d6d6
| 496374 ||  || — || September 11, 2007 || Mount Lemmon || Mount Lemmon Survey || TIR || align=right | 2.5 km || 
|-id=375 bgcolor=#E9E9E9
| 496375 ||  || — || September 27, 2013 || Haleakala || Pan-STARRS || HOF || align=right | 2.2 km || 
|-id=376 bgcolor=#E9E9E9
| 496376 ||  || — || October 23, 2009 || Kitt Peak || Spacewatch ||  || align=right | 1.7 km || 
|-id=377 bgcolor=#E9E9E9
| 496377 ||  || — || September 13, 2004 || Kitt Peak || Spacewatch ||  || align=right | 1.8 km || 
|-id=378 bgcolor=#E9E9E9
| 496378 ||  || — || January 30, 2011 || Haleakala || Pan-STARRS ||  || align=right | 1.7 km || 
|-id=379 bgcolor=#E9E9E9
| 496379 ||  || — || November 16, 2009 || Kitt Peak || Spacewatch ||  || align=right | 1.7 km || 
|-id=380 bgcolor=#E9E9E9
| 496380 ||  || — || January 30, 2011 || Haleakala || Pan-STARRS ||  || align=right | 2.0 km || 
|-id=381 bgcolor=#E9E9E9
| 496381 ||  || — || May 15, 2012 || Haleakala || Pan-STARRS ||  || align=right | 1.9 km || 
|-id=382 bgcolor=#fefefe
| 496382 ||  || — || July 19, 2009 || La Sagra || OAM Obs. ||  || align=right data-sort-value="0.86" | 860 m || 
|-id=383 bgcolor=#E9E9E9
| 496383 ||  || — || September 24, 2000 || Socorro || LINEAR ||  || align=right | 1.6 km || 
|-id=384 bgcolor=#E9E9E9
| 496384 ||  || — || May 1, 2012 || Mount Lemmon || Mount Lemmon Survey || EUN || align=right | 1.3 km || 
|-id=385 bgcolor=#E9E9E9
| 496385 ||  || — || February 4, 2011 || Haleakala || Pan-STARRS ||  || align=right | 2.3 km || 
|-id=386 bgcolor=#E9E9E9
| 496386 ||  || — || September 6, 2013 || Kitt Peak || Spacewatch ||  || align=right | 1.2 km || 
|-id=387 bgcolor=#d6d6d6
| 496387 ||  || — || July 16, 2013 || Haleakala || Pan-STARRS ||  || align=right | 3.5 km || 
|-id=388 bgcolor=#fefefe
| 496388 ||  || — || October 23, 2006 || Mount Lemmon || Mount Lemmon Survey ||  || align=right data-sort-value="0.67" | 670 m || 
|-id=389 bgcolor=#d6d6d6
| 496389 ||  || — || April 3, 2011 || Haleakala || Pan-STARRS ||  || align=right | 3.2 km || 
|-id=390 bgcolor=#d6d6d6
| 496390 ||  || — || September 15, 2013 || Haleakala || Pan-STARRS || 637 || align=right | 2.9 km || 
|-id=391 bgcolor=#fefefe
| 496391 ||  || — || December 13, 2006 || Kitt Peak || Spacewatch ||  || align=right data-sort-value="0.70" | 700 m || 
|-id=392 bgcolor=#FA8072
| 496392 ||  || — || December 21, 2005 || Kitt Peak || Spacewatch ||  || align=right data-sort-value="0.68" | 680 m || 
|-id=393 bgcolor=#E9E9E9
| 496393 ||  || — || August 8, 2004 || Campo Imperatore || CINEOS ||  || align=right | 1.3 km || 
|-id=394 bgcolor=#d6d6d6
| 496394 ||  || — || July 16, 2013 || Haleakala || Pan-STARRS ||  || align=right | 3.3 km || 
|-id=395 bgcolor=#E9E9E9
| 496395 ||  || — || May 5, 2008 || Mount Lemmon || Mount Lemmon Survey ||  || align=right | 1.2 km || 
|-id=396 bgcolor=#E9E9E9
| 496396 ||  || — || October 9, 2004 || Kitt Peak || Spacewatch ||  || align=right | 1.6 km || 
|-id=397 bgcolor=#E9E9E9
| 496397 ||  || — || March 24, 2003 || Kitt Peak || Spacewatch ||  || align=right | 2.4 km || 
|-id=398 bgcolor=#d6d6d6
| 496398 ||  || — || October 1, 2013 || Kitt Peak || Spacewatch ||  || align=right | 3.3 km || 
|-id=399 bgcolor=#d6d6d6
| 496399 ||  || — || October 29, 2008 || Kitt Peak || Spacewatch ||  || align=right | 2.2 km || 
|-id=400 bgcolor=#fefefe
| 496400 ||  || — || August 16, 2009 || La Sagra || OAM Obs. ||  || align=right data-sort-value="0.76" | 760 m || 
|}

496401–496500 

|-bgcolor=#d6d6d6
| 496401 ||  || — || April 13, 2011 || Haleakala || Pan-STARRS || URS || align=right | 3.2 km || 
|-id=402 bgcolor=#E9E9E9
| 496402 ||  || — || November 9, 1999 || Kitt Peak || Spacewatch ||  || align=right | 2.1 km || 
|-id=403 bgcolor=#E9E9E9
| 496403 ||  || — || September 13, 2013 || Kitt Peak || Spacewatch || EUN || align=right | 1.4 km || 
|-id=404 bgcolor=#E9E9E9
| 496404 ||  || — || August 27, 2004 || Anderson Mesa || LONEOS ||  || align=right | 2.0 km || 
|-id=405 bgcolor=#E9E9E9
| 496405 ||  || — || June 2, 2008 || Mount Lemmon || Mount Lemmon Survey ||  || align=right | 2.3 km || 
|-id=406 bgcolor=#d6d6d6
| 496406 ||  || — || September 13, 2007 || Catalina || CSS ||  || align=right | 3.6 km || 
|-id=407 bgcolor=#d6d6d6
| 496407 ||  || — || October 13, 2007 || Catalina || CSS || LIX || align=right | 2.6 km || 
|-id=408 bgcolor=#E9E9E9
| 496408 ||  || — || November 11, 2004 || Kitt Peak || Spacewatch || CLO || align=right | 1.8 km || 
|-id=409 bgcolor=#E9E9E9
| 496409 ||  || — || October 8, 2004 || Socorro || LINEAR ||  || align=right | 2.2 km || 
|-id=410 bgcolor=#E9E9E9
| 496410 ||  || — || October 27, 2008 || Mount Lemmon || Mount Lemmon Survey ||  || align=right | 2.4 km || 
|-id=411 bgcolor=#d6d6d6
| 496411 ||  || — || October 26, 2013 || Mount Lemmon || Mount Lemmon Survey ||  || align=right | 3.2 km || 
|-id=412 bgcolor=#d6d6d6
| 496412 ||  || — || October 17, 2013 || Haleakala || Pan-STARRS || Tj (2.97) || align=right | 4.4 km || 
|-id=413 bgcolor=#E9E9E9
| 496413 ||  || — || December 13, 2004 || Kitt Peak || Spacewatch || DOR || align=right | 3.9 km || 
|-id=414 bgcolor=#d6d6d6
| 496414 ||  || — || October 22, 2012 || Haleakala || Pan-STARRS ||  || align=right | 2.6 km || 
|-id=415 bgcolor=#d6d6d6
| 496415 ||  || — || September 5, 2007 || Catalina || CSS ||  || align=right | 3.2 km || 
|-id=416 bgcolor=#d6d6d6
| 496416 ||  || — || November 12, 2012 || Haleakala || Pan-STARRS ||  || align=right | 3.3 km || 
|-id=417 bgcolor=#d6d6d6
| 496417 ||  || — || December 25, 2013 || Mount Lemmon || Mount Lemmon Survey || SYL7:4 || align=right | 3.4 km || 
|-id=418 bgcolor=#FA8072
| 496418 ||  || — || February 9, 2014 || Haleakala || Pan-STARRS || H || align=right data-sort-value="0.64" | 640 m || 
|-id=419 bgcolor=#C2FFFF
| 496419 ||  || — || September 25, 2008 || Mount Lemmon || Mount Lemmon Survey || L4 || align=right | 7.1 km || 
|-id=420 bgcolor=#E9E9E9
| 496420 ||  || — || February 26, 2014 || Haleakala || Pan-STARRS || EUN || align=right | 1.5 km || 
|-id=421 bgcolor=#E9E9E9
| 496421 ||  || — || February 10, 2014 || Haleakala || Pan-STARRS ||  || align=right | 1.5 km || 
|-id=422 bgcolor=#fefefe
| 496422 ||  || — || February 28, 2009 || Kitt Peak || Spacewatch || H || align=right data-sort-value="0.61" | 610 m || 
|-id=423 bgcolor=#fefefe
| 496423 ||  || — || February 10, 2014 || Haleakala || Pan-STARRS || H || align=right data-sort-value="0.63" | 630 m || 
|-id=424 bgcolor=#E9E9E9
| 496424 ||  || — || February 27, 2014 || Kitt Peak || Spacewatch ||  || align=right | 2.3 km || 
|-id=425 bgcolor=#d6d6d6
| 496425 ||  || — || October 19, 2011 || Mount Lemmon || Mount Lemmon Survey ||  || align=right | 2.8 km || 
|-id=426 bgcolor=#d6d6d6
| 496426 ||  || — || October 29, 2011 || Haleakala || Pan-STARRS ||  || align=right | 3.8 km || 
|-id=427 bgcolor=#fefefe
| 496427 ||  || — || March 23, 2014 || Kitt Peak || Spacewatch || H || align=right data-sort-value="0.62" | 620 m || 
|-id=428 bgcolor=#fefefe
| 496428 ||  || — || January 12, 2011 || Kitt Peak || Spacewatch || H || align=right data-sort-value="0.78" | 780 m || 
|-id=429 bgcolor=#E9E9E9
| 496429 ||  || — || February 28, 2014 || Haleakala || Pan-STARRS ||  || align=right | 2.3 km || 
|-id=430 bgcolor=#fefefe
| 496430 ||  || — || May 6, 2014 || Haleakala || Pan-STARRS || H || align=right data-sort-value="0.67" | 670 m || 
|-id=431 bgcolor=#d6d6d6
| 496431 ||  || — || October 26, 2011 || Haleakala || Pan-STARRS ||  || align=right | 2.9 km || 
|-id=432 bgcolor=#fefefe
| 496432 ||  || — || May 6, 2014 || Haleakala || Pan-STARRS ||  || align=right data-sort-value="0.70" | 700 m || 
|-id=433 bgcolor=#fefefe
| 496433 ||  || — || October 2, 2003 || Kitt Peak || Spacewatch ||  || align=right data-sort-value="0.68" | 680 m || 
|-id=434 bgcolor=#d6d6d6
| 496434 ||  || — || April 26, 2003 || Kitt Peak || Spacewatch ||  || align=right | 2.0 km || 
|-id=435 bgcolor=#fefefe
| 496435 ||  || — || June 1, 2014 || Haleakala || Pan-STARRS || H || align=right data-sort-value="0.60" | 600 m || 
|-id=436 bgcolor=#FA8072
| 496436 ||  || — || October 25, 2011 || Haleakala || Pan-STARRS ||  || align=right data-sort-value="0.94" | 940 m || 
|-id=437 bgcolor=#d6d6d6
| 496437 ||  || — || April 7, 2008 || Kitt Peak || Spacewatch ||  || align=right | 2.2 km || 
|-id=438 bgcolor=#fefefe
| 496438 ||  || — || October 25, 2011 || Haleakala || Pan-STARRS ||  || align=right data-sort-value="0.87" | 870 m || 
|-id=439 bgcolor=#fefefe
| 496439 ||  || — || March 14, 2007 || Mount Lemmon || Mount Lemmon Survey ||  || align=right data-sort-value="0.58" | 580 m || 
|-id=440 bgcolor=#fefefe
| 496440 ||  || — || July 26, 2014 || Haleakala || Pan-STARRS ||  || align=right data-sort-value="0.85" | 850 m || 
|-id=441 bgcolor=#fefefe
| 496441 ||  || — || April 25, 2007 || Kitt Peak || Spacewatch ||  || align=right data-sort-value="0.52" | 520 m || 
|-id=442 bgcolor=#d6d6d6
| 496442 ||  || — || August 27, 2009 || Kitt Peak || Spacewatch || THM || align=right | 1.9 km || 
|-id=443 bgcolor=#d6d6d6
| 496443 ||  || — || April 17, 2013 || Haleakala || Pan-STARRS ||  || align=right | 2.8 km || 
|-id=444 bgcolor=#fefefe
| 496444 ||  || — || October 25, 2011 || Haleakala || Pan-STARRS ||  || align=right data-sort-value="0.61" | 610 m || 
|-id=445 bgcolor=#fefefe
| 496445 ||  || — || January 30, 2008 || Kitt Peak || Spacewatch ||  || align=right data-sort-value="0.70" | 700 m || 
|-id=446 bgcolor=#d6d6d6
| 496446 ||  || — || February 3, 2012 || Haleakala || Pan-STARRS ||  || align=right | 2.6 km || 
|-id=447 bgcolor=#fefefe
| 496447 ||  || — || November 26, 2011 || Haleakala || Pan-STARRS ||  || align=right data-sort-value="0.66" | 660 m || 
|-id=448 bgcolor=#fefefe
| 496448 ||  || — || January 3, 2013 || Haleakala || Pan-STARRS || H || align=right data-sort-value="0.67" | 670 m || 
|-id=449 bgcolor=#fefefe
| 496449 ||  || — || June 24, 2014 || Haleakala || Pan-STARRS ||  || align=right data-sort-value="0.53" | 530 m || 
|-id=450 bgcolor=#fefefe
| 496450 ||  || — || April 20, 2007 || Kitt Peak || Spacewatch ||  || align=right data-sort-value="0.64" | 640 m || 
|-id=451 bgcolor=#FA8072
| 496451 ||  || — || February 13, 2013 || Haleakala || Pan-STARRS || H || align=right data-sort-value="0.74" | 740 m || 
|-id=452 bgcolor=#d6d6d6
| 496452 ||  || — || May 18, 2012 || Haleakala || Pan-STARRS ||  || align=right | 2.7 km || 
|-id=453 bgcolor=#fefefe
| 496453 ||  || — || August 5, 2014 || Haleakala || Pan-STARRS ||  || align=right data-sort-value="0.89" | 890 m || 
|-id=454 bgcolor=#fefefe
| 496454 ||  || — || October 23, 2011 || Haleakala || Pan-STARRS ||  || align=right data-sort-value="0.76" | 760 m || 
|-id=455 bgcolor=#fefefe
| 496455 ||  || — || July 6, 2014 || Haleakala || Pan-STARRS ||  || align=right data-sort-value="0.67" | 670 m || 
|-id=456 bgcolor=#E9E9E9
| 496456 ||  || — || October 17, 2010 || Mount Lemmon || Mount Lemmon Survey ||  || align=right | 2.1 km || 
|-id=457 bgcolor=#FA8072
| 496457 ||  || — || October 29, 2005 || Catalina || CSS ||  || align=right data-sort-value="0.57" | 570 m || 
|-id=458 bgcolor=#fefefe
| 496458 ||  || — || March 8, 2013 || Haleakala || Pan-STARRS ||  || align=right data-sort-value="0.71" | 710 m || 
|-id=459 bgcolor=#d6d6d6
| 496459 ||  || — || February 26, 2012 || Kitt Peak || Spacewatch ||  || align=right | 3.1 km || 
|-id=460 bgcolor=#fefefe
| 496460 ||  || — || April 11, 2010 || Mount Lemmon || Mount Lemmon Survey ||  || align=right data-sort-value="0.55" | 550 m || 
|-id=461 bgcolor=#fefefe
| 496461 ||  || — || September 24, 2011 || Haleakala || Pan-STARRS ||  || align=right data-sort-value="0.69" | 690 m || 
|-id=462 bgcolor=#d6d6d6
| 496462 ||  || — || October 23, 2009 || Mount Lemmon || Mount Lemmon Survey ||  || align=right | 2.7 km || 
|-id=463 bgcolor=#E9E9E9
| 496463 ||  || — || January 11, 2011 || Mount Lemmon || Mount Lemmon Survey ||  || align=right | 2.4 km || 
|-id=464 bgcolor=#d6d6d6
| 496464 ||  || — || February 1, 2006 || Kitt Peak || Spacewatch || THM || align=right | 2.4 km || 
|-id=465 bgcolor=#d6d6d6
| 496465 ||  || — || October 23, 2009 || Mount Lemmon || Mount Lemmon Survey || THM || align=right | 1.8 km || 
|-id=466 bgcolor=#fefefe
| 496466 ||  || — || September 17, 2003 || Kitt Peak || Spacewatch ||  || align=right data-sort-value="0.55" | 550 m || 
|-id=467 bgcolor=#fefefe
| 496467 ||  || — || September 5, 2007 || Mount Lemmon || Mount Lemmon Survey ||  || align=right data-sort-value="0.52" | 520 m || 
|-id=468 bgcolor=#fefefe
| 496468 ||  || — || October 9, 2007 || Kitt Peak || Spacewatch ||  || align=right data-sort-value="0.50" | 500 m || 
|-id=469 bgcolor=#fefefe
| 496469 ||  || — || August 24, 2007 || Kitt Peak || Spacewatch ||  || align=right data-sort-value="0.51" | 510 m || 
|-id=470 bgcolor=#E9E9E9
| 496470 ||  || — || November 12, 2010 || Mount Lemmon || Mount Lemmon Survey ||  || align=right | 1.3 km || 
|-id=471 bgcolor=#d6d6d6
| 496471 ||  || — || February 28, 2012 || Haleakala || Pan-STARRS || TIR || align=right | 2.9 km || 
|-id=472 bgcolor=#fefefe
| 496472 ||  || — || January 23, 2006 || Kitt Peak || Spacewatch ||  || align=right data-sort-value="0.67" | 670 m || 
|-id=473 bgcolor=#E9E9E9
| 496473 ||  || — || September 18, 2001 || Kitt Peak || Spacewatch ||  || align=right | 1.5 km || 
|-id=474 bgcolor=#d6d6d6
| 496474 ||  || — || March 15, 2011 || Haleakala || Pan-STARRS ||  || align=right | 2.3 km || 
|-id=475 bgcolor=#fefefe
| 496475 ||  || — || March 2, 2009 || Mount Lemmon || Mount Lemmon Survey ||  || align=right | 1.0 km || 
|-id=476 bgcolor=#E9E9E9
| 496476 ||  || — || May 2, 2009 || Kitt Peak || Spacewatch ||  || align=right | 2.3 km || 
|-id=477 bgcolor=#d6d6d6
| 496477 ||  || — || March 4, 2011 || Mount Lemmon || Mount Lemmon Survey ||  || align=right | 2.7 km || 
|-id=478 bgcolor=#E9E9E9
| 496478 ||  || — || January 28, 2007 || Kitt Peak || Spacewatch ||  || align=right | 1.5 km || 
|-id=479 bgcolor=#fefefe
| 496479 ||  || — || November 19, 2007 || Mount Lemmon || Mount Lemmon Survey ||  || align=right | 1.1 km || 
|-id=480 bgcolor=#fefefe
| 496480 ||  || — || November 6, 2007 || Kitt Peak || Spacewatch ||  || align=right data-sort-value="0.92" | 920 m || 
|-id=481 bgcolor=#fefefe
| 496481 ||  || — || April 13, 2013 || Haleakala || Pan-STARRS ||  || align=right data-sort-value="0.88" | 880 m || 
|-id=482 bgcolor=#fefefe
| 496482 ||  || — || October 16, 2003 || Socorro || LINEAR ||  || align=right | 2.5 km || 
|-id=483 bgcolor=#E9E9E9
| 496483 ||  || — || December 1, 2010 || Mount Lemmon || Mount Lemmon Survey ||  || align=right | 1.2 km || 
|-id=484 bgcolor=#fefefe
| 496484 ||  || — || October 10, 2007 || Mount Lemmon || Mount Lemmon Survey ||  || align=right data-sort-value="0.60" | 600 m || 
|-id=485 bgcolor=#E9E9E9
| 496485 ||  || — || September 2, 2014 || Haleakala || Pan-STARRS ||  || align=right | 1.5 km || 
|-id=486 bgcolor=#fefefe
| 496486 ||  || — || May 10, 2010 || WISE || WISE ||  || align=right | 1.1 km || 
|-id=487 bgcolor=#fefefe
| 496487 ||  || — || October 30, 2007 || Mount Lemmon || Mount Lemmon Survey ||  || align=right data-sort-value="0.70" | 700 m || 
|-id=488 bgcolor=#fefefe
| 496488 ||  || — || December 5, 2007 || Kitt Peak || Spacewatch ||  || align=right data-sort-value="0.60" | 600 m || 
|-id=489 bgcolor=#fefefe
| 496489 ||  || — || October 1, 2014 || Kitt Peak || Spacewatch ||  || align=right data-sort-value="0.83" | 830 m || 
|-id=490 bgcolor=#fefefe
| 496490 ||  || — || September 5, 2010 || La Sagra || OAM Obs. || MAS || align=right data-sort-value="0.83" | 830 m || 
|-id=491 bgcolor=#fefefe
| 496491 ||  || — || June 7, 2013 || Haleakala || Pan-STARRS ||  || align=right | 1.0 km || 
|-id=492 bgcolor=#E9E9E9
| 496492 ||  || — || March 14, 2012 || Kitt Peak || Spacewatch || EUN || align=right | 2.0 km || 
|-id=493 bgcolor=#fefefe
| 496493 ||  || — || September 11, 2007 || Catalina || CSS ||  || align=right data-sort-value="0.90" | 900 m || 
|-id=494 bgcolor=#fefefe
| 496494 ||  || — || August 24, 2007 || Kitt Peak || Spacewatch || NYS || align=right data-sort-value="0.87" | 870 m || 
|-id=495 bgcolor=#E9E9E9
| 496495 ||  || — || November 17, 2006 || Mount Lemmon || Mount Lemmon Survey ||  || align=right data-sort-value="0.89" | 890 m || 
|-id=496 bgcolor=#E9E9E9
| 496496 ||  || — || November 13, 2006 || Catalina || CSS ||  || align=right data-sort-value="0.82" | 820 m || 
|-id=497 bgcolor=#E9E9E9
| 496497 ||  || — || November 18, 2006 || Mount Lemmon || Mount Lemmon Survey ||  || align=right | 1.3 km || 
|-id=498 bgcolor=#fefefe
| 496498 ||  || — || November 11, 2004 || Kitt Peak || Spacewatch ||  || align=right data-sort-value="0.74" | 740 m || 
|-id=499 bgcolor=#fefefe
| 496499 ||  || — || October 14, 2007 || Mount Lemmon || Mount Lemmon Survey ||  || align=right data-sort-value="0.83" | 830 m || 
|-id=500 bgcolor=#E9E9E9
| 496500 ||  || — || August 16, 2009 || Kitt Peak || Spacewatch || DOR || align=right | 1.9 km || 
|}

496501–496600 

|-bgcolor=#E9E9E9
| 496501 ||  || — || December 3, 2010 || Mount Lemmon || Mount Lemmon Survey ||  || align=right | 1.4 km || 
|-id=502 bgcolor=#E9E9E9
| 496502 ||  || — || May 13, 2004 || Kitt Peak || Spacewatch ||  || align=right | 2.3 km || 
|-id=503 bgcolor=#E9E9E9
| 496503 ||  || — || September 24, 2014 || Kitt Peak || Spacewatch ||  || align=right | 1.0 km || 
|-id=504 bgcolor=#fefefe
| 496504 ||  || — || October 21, 2014 || Mount Lemmon || Mount Lemmon Survey ||  || align=right data-sort-value="0.68" | 680 m || 
|-id=505 bgcolor=#E9E9E9
| 496505 ||  || — || November 1, 2010 || Mount Lemmon || Mount Lemmon Survey || MAR || align=right | 1.1 km || 
|-id=506 bgcolor=#E9E9E9
| 496506 ||  || — || March 16, 2007 || Kitt Peak || Spacewatch || AGN || align=right | 2.1 km || 
|-id=507 bgcolor=#fefefe
| 496507 ||  || — || February 1, 2012 || Kitt Peak || Spacewatch ||  || align=right data-sort-value="0.82" | 820 m || 
|-id=508 bgcolor=#E9E9E9
| 496508 ||  || — || September 13, 2005 || Kitt Peak || Spacewatch ||  || align=right | 1.2 km || 
|-id=509 bgcolor=#E9E9E9
| 496509 ||  || — || September 18, 2009 || Kitt Peak || Spacewatch ||  || align=right | 2.3 km || 
|-id=510 bgcolor=#fefefe
| 496510 ||  || — || October 15, 2007 || Mount Lemmon || Mount Lemmon Survey ||  || align=right data-sort-value="0.75" | 750 m || 
|-id=511 bgcolor=#E9E9E9
| 496511 ||  || — || November 20, 2001 || Socorro || LINEAR ||  || align=right | 1.8 km || 
|-id=512 bgcolor=#E9E9E9
| 496512 ||  || — || March 27, 2012 || Haleakala || Pan-STARRS || KRM || align=right | 1.4 km || 
|-id=513 bgcolor=#E9E9E9
| 496513 ||  || — || April 27, 2012 || Haleakala || Pan-STARRS ||  || align=right | 1.2 km || 
|-id=514 bgcolor=#fefefe
| 496514 ||  || — || August 31, 2014 || Haleakala || Pan-STARRS ||  || align=right data-sort-value="0.91" | 910 m || 
|-id=515 bgcolor=#fefefe
| 496515 ||  || — || September 13, 2007 || Catalina || CSS ||  || align=right data-sort-value="0.83" | 830 m || 
|-id=516 bgcolor=#E9E9E9
| 496516 ||  || — || June 15, 2013 || Haleakala || Pan-STARRS || MAR || align=right | 1.6 km || 
|-id=517 bgcolor=#E9E9E9
| 496517 ||  || — || January 17, 2007 || Mount Lemmon || Mount Lemmon Survey ||  || align=right | 1.2 km || 
|-id=518 bgcolor=#E9E9E9
| 496518 ||  || — || December 2, 2010 || Mount Lemmon || Mount Lemmon Survey ||  || align=right | 1.2 km || 
|-id=519 bgcolor=#fefefe
| 496519 ||  || — || May 4, 2006 || Siding Spring || SSS ||  || align=right | 1.1 km || 
|-id=520 bgcolor=#E9E9E9
| 496520 ||  || — || January 9, 2002 || Socorro || LINEAR ||  || align=right | 2.9 km || 
|-id=521 bgcolor=#fefefe
| 496521 ||  || — || October 5, 2010 || La Sagra || OAM Obs. ||  || align=right data-sort-value="0.97" | 970 m || 
|-id=522 bgcolor=#fefefe
| 496522 ||  || — || January 26, 2012 || Mount Lemmon || Mount Lemmon Survey ||  || align=right data-sort-value="0.94" | 940 m || 
|-id=523 bgcolor=#d6d6d6
| 496523 ||  || — || September 23, 2008 || Kitt Peak || Spacewatch ||  || align=right | 2.8 km || 
|-id=524 bgcolor=#E9E9E9
| 496524 ||  || — || October 14, 2014 || Kitt Peak || Spacewatch ||  || align=right | 1.6 km || 
|-id=525 bgcolor=#E9E9E9
| 496525 ||  || — || September 18, 2009 || Kitt Peak || Spacewatch ||  || align=right | 2.2 km || 
|-id=526 bgcolor=#fefefe
| 496526 ||  || — || September 25, 2014 || Mount Lemmon || Mount Lemmon Survey ||  || align=right data-sort-value="0.68" | 680 m || 
|-id=527 bgcolor=#E9E9E9
| 496527 ||  || — || October 13, 2001 || Anderson Mesa || LONEOS ||  || align=right | 1.1 km || 
|-id=528 bgcolor=#E9E9E9
| 496528 ||  || — || April 19, 2012 || Mount Lemmon || Mount Lemmon Survey ||  || align=right | 2.4 km || 
|-id=529 bgcolor=#E9E9E9
| 496529 ||  || — || March 11, 2008 || Kitt Peak || Spacewatch || (5) || align=right | 1.1 km || 
|-id=530 bgcolor=#fefefe
| 496530 ||  || — || September 7, 2010 || La Sagra || OAM Obs. ||  || align=right data-sort-value="0.82" | 820 m || 
|-id=531 bgcolor=#fefefe
| 496531 ||  || — || February 8, 2008 || Mount Lemmon || Mount Lemmon Survey ||  || align=right data-sort-value="0.69" | 690 m || 
|-id=532 bgcolor=#d6d6d6
| 496532 ||  || — || October 31, 2008 || Mount Lemmon || Mount Lemmon Survey ||  || align=right | 2.9 km || 
|-id=533 bgcolor=#E9E9E9
| 496533 ||  || — || January 22, 2012 || Haleakala || Pan-STARRS ||  || align=right | 1.5 km || 
|-id=534 bgcolor=#E9E9E9
| 496534 ||  || — || March 7, 2008 || Kitt Peak || Spacewatch ||  || align=right | 1.5 km || 
|-id=535 bgcolor=#fefefe
| 496535 ||  || — || July 6, 2013 || Haleakala || Pan-STARRS ||  || align=right data-sort-value="0.88" | 880 m || 
|-id=536 bgcolor=#d6d6d6
| 496536 ||  || — || April 2, 2011 || Haleakala || Pan-STARRS ||  || align=right | 2.9 km || 
|-id=537 bgcolor=#d6d6d6
| 496537 ||  || — || April 23, 2010 || WISE || WISE ||  || align=right | 3.1 km || 
|-id=538 bgcolor=#E9E9E9
| 496538 ||  || — || July 16, 2013 || Haleakala || Pan-STARRS || MAR || align=right | 1.4 km || 
|-id=539 bgcolor=#d6d6d6
| 496539 ||  || — || September 18, 2014 || Haleakala || Pan-STARRS ||  || align=right | 2.7 km || 
|-id=540 bgcolor=#fefefe
| 496540 ||  || — || January 2, 2012 || Mount Lemmon || Mount Lemmon Survey ||  || align=right data-sort-value="0.84" | 840 m || 
|-id=541 bgcolor=#E9E9E9
| 496541 ||  || — || September 16, 2009 || Kitt Peak || Spacewatch ||  || align=right | 2.3 km || 
|-id=542 bgcolor=#d6d6d6
| 496542 ||  || — || March 28, 2011 || Kitt Peak || Spacewatch ||  || align=right | 2.6 km || 
|-id=543 bgcolor=#E9E9E9
| 496543 ||  || — || October 22, 2014 || Kitt Peak || Spacewatch ||  || align=right | 1.3 km || 
|-id=544 bgcolor=#d6d6d6
| 496544 ||  || — || October 1, 2003 || Kitt Peak || Spacewatch ||  || align=right | 2.5 km || 
|-id=545 bgcolor=#E9E9E9
| 496545 ||  || — || January 30, 2011 || Haleakala || Pan-STARRS ||  || align=right | 2.4 km || 
|-id=546 bgcolor=#E9E9E9
| 496546 ||  || — || August 8, 2013 || Haleakala || Pan-STARRS || WIT || align=right | 2.1 km || 
|-id=547 bgcolor=#E9E9E9
| 496547 ||  || — || September 16, 2009 || Mount Lemmon || Mount Lemmon Survey ||  || align=right | 1.4 km || 
|-id=548 bgcolor=#E9E9E9
| 496548 ||  || — || April 6, 2008 || Kitt Peak || Spacewatch || HNS || align=right | 1.1 km || 
|-id=549 bgcolor=#fefefe
| 496549 ||  || — || April 17, 2013 || Haleakala || Pan-STARRS ||  || align=right data-sort-value="0.78" | 780 m || 
|-id=550 bgcolor=#E9E9E9
| 496550 ||  || — || December 15, 2010 || Mount Lemmon || Mount Lemmon Survey ||  || align=right | 1.1 km || 
|-id=551 bgcolor=#E9E9E9
| 496551 ||  || — || September 19, 2010 || Kitt Peak || Spacewatch ||  || align=right | 1.9 km || 
|-id=552 bgcolor=#E9E9E9
| 496552 ||  || — || October 5, 2014 || Mount Lemmon || Mount Lemmon Survey ||  || align=right | 1.1 km || 
|-id=553 bgcolor=#E9E9E9
| 496553 ||  || — || December 10, 2006 || Kitt Peak || Spacewatch ||  || align=right data-sort-value="0.78" | 780 m || 
|-id=554 bgcolor=#d6d6d6
| 496554 ||  || — || December 15, 2009 || Mount Lemmon || Mount Lemmon Survey || EOS || align=right | 3.0 km || 
|-id=555 bgcolor=#fefefe
| 496555 ||  || — || March 13, 2005 || Kitt Peak || Spacewatch ||  || align=right data-sort-value="0.67" | 670 m || 
|-id=556 bgcolor=#d6d6d6
| 496556 ||  || — || December 1, 2008 || Catalina || CSS || EOS || align=right | 3.2 km || 
|-id=557 bgcolor=#d6d6d6
| 496557 ||  || — || May 13, 2010 || WISE || WISE ||  || align=right | 4.4 km || 
|-id=558 bgcolor=#E9E9E9
| 496558 ||  || — || August 9, 2013 || Kitt Peak || Spacewatch ||  || align=right | 1.9 km || 
|-id=559 bgcolor=#E9E9E9
| 496559 ||  || — || October 16, 2009 || Catalina || CSS ||  || align=right | 1.9 km || 
|-id=560 bgcolor=#E9E9E9
| 496560 ||  || — || September 17, 2009 || Kitt Peak || Spacewatch ||  || align=right | 2.0 km || 
|-id=561 bgcolor=#E9E9E9
| 496561 ||  || — || March 15, 2012 || Haleakala || Pan-STARRS ||  || align=right | 2.1 km || 
|-id=562 bgcolor=#E9E9E9
| 496562 ||  || — || March 4, 2011 || Catalina || CSS ||  || align=right | 2.9 km || 
|-id=563 bgcolor=#E9E9E9
| 496563 ||  || — || November 11, 2009 || Catalina || CSS || MAR || align=right | 2.2 km || 
|-id=564 bgcolor=#d6d6d6
| 496564 ||  || — || November 19, 2003 || Campo Imperatore || CINEOS ||  || align=right | 2.4 km || 
|-id=565 bgcolor=#fefefe
| 496565 ||  || — || December 15, 2007 || Kitt Peak || Spacewatch ||  || align=right data-sort-value="0.99" | 990 m || 
|-id=566 bgcolor=#d6d6d6
| 496566 ||  || — || August 17, 2012 || Haleakala || Pan-STARRS ||  || align=right | 4.9 km || 
|-id=567 bgcolor=#d6d6d6
| 496567 ||  || — || December 29, 2008 || Kitt Peak || Spacewatch ||  || align=right | 3.6 km || 
|-id=568 bgcolor=#d6d6d6
| 496568 ||  || — || December 16, 2009 || Mount Lemmon || Mount Lemmon Survey ||  || align=right | 2.9 km || 
|-id=569 bgcolor=#E9E9E9
| 496569 ||  || — || January 14, 2011 || Kitt Peak || Spacewatch ||  || align=right | 1.6 km || 
|-id=570 bgcolor=#d6d6d6
| 496570 ||  || — || December 21, 2003 || Kitt Peak || Spacewatch ||  || align=right | 3.9 km || 
|-id=571 bgcolor=#d6d6d6
| 496571 ||  || — || February 17, 2010 || Mount Lemmon || Mount Lemmon Survey || HYG || align=right | 2.6 km || 
|-id=572 bgcolor=#d6d6d6
| 496572 ||  || — || September 1, 2013 || Mount Lemmon || Mount Lemmon Survey ||  || align=right | 2.4 km || 
|-id=573 bgcolor=#E9E9E9
| 496573 ||  || — || August 12, 2013 || Haleakala || Pan-STARRS ||  || align=right | 3.3 km || 
|-id=574 bgcolor=#E9E9E9
| 496574 ||  || — || September 24, 2009 || Mount Lemmon || Mount Lemmon Survey ||  || align=right data-sort-value="0.80" | 800 m || 
|-id=575 bgcolor=#fefefe
| 496575 ||  || — || October 13, 2006 || Kitt Peak || Spacewatch ||  || align=right data-sort-value="0.71" | 710 m || 
|-id=576 bgcolor=#E9E9E9
| 496576 ||  || — || January 30, 2011 || Mount Lemmon || Mount Lemmon Survey ||  || align=right data-sort-value="0.87" | 870 m || 
|-id=577 bgcolor=#d6d6d6
| 496577 ||  || — || October 5, 2012 || Haleakala || Pan-STARRS ||  || align=right | 2.4 km || 
|-id=578 bgcolor=#d6d6d6
| 496578 ||  || — || October 3, 2003 || Kitt Peak || Spacewatch ||  || align=right | 3.0 km || 
|-id=579 bgcolor=#d6d6d6
| 496579 ||  || — || May 8, 2010 || Mount Lemmon || Mount Lemmon Survey || TIR || align=right | 3.1 km || 
|-id=580 bgcolor=#d6d6d6
| 496580 ||  || — || May 5, 2010 || WISE || WISE || EUP || align=right | 4.9 km || 
|-id=581 bgcolor=#d6d6d6
| 496581 ||  || — || April 22, 2011 || Kitt Peak || Spacewatch ||  || align=right | 3.1 km || 
|-id=582 bgcolor=#d6d6d6
| 496582 ||  || — || November 3, 2007 || Kitt Peak || Spacewatch ||  || align=right | 3.3 km || 
|-id=583 bgcolor=#E9E9E9
| 496583 ||  || — || September 1, 2013 || Haleakala || Pan-STARRS ||  || align=right | 1.6 km || 
|-id=584 bgcolor=#d6d6d6
| 496584 ||  || — || October 26, 2008 || Mount Lemmon || Mount Lemmon Survey ||  || align=right | 2.4 km || 
|-id=585 bgcolor=#E9E9E9
| 496585 ||  || — || October 4, 2004 || Kitt Peak || Spacewatch || AGN || align=right | 1.8 km || 
|-id=586 bgcolor=#d6d6d6
| 496586 ||  || — || April 30, 2011 || Kitt Peak || Spacewatch || EOS || align=right | 2.8 km || 
|-id=587 bgcolor=#d6d6d6
| 496587 ||  || — || January 15, 2010 || WISE || WISE || EUP || align=right | 3.7 km || 
|-id=588 bgcolor=#d6d6d6
| 496588 ||  || — || October 24, 2008 || Kitt Peak || Spacewatch ||  || align=right | 2.7 km || 
|-id=589 bgcolor=#d6d6d6
| 496589 ||  || — || May 21, 2006 || Kitt Peak || Spacewatch ||  || align=right | 2.9 km || 
|-id=590 bgcolor=#fefefe
| 496590 ||  || — || December 18, 2007 || Mount Lemmon || Mount Lemmon Survey ||  || align=right data-sort-value="0.59" | 590 m || 
|-id=591 bgcolor=#E9E9E9
| 496591 ||  || — || October 3, 2013 || Haleakala || Pan-STARRS || AGN || align=right | 2.2 km || 
|-id=592 bgcolor=#E9E9E9
| 496592 ||  || — || April 25, 2007 || Mount Lemmon || Mount Lemmon Survey ||  || align=right | 2.4 km || 
|-id=593 bgcolor=#fefefe
| 496593 ||  || — || February 27, 2012 || Haleakala || Pan-STARRS ||  || align=right data-sort-value="0.68" | 680 m || 
|-id=594 bgcolor=#d6d6d6
| 496594 ||  || — || December 31, 2008 || Mount Lemmon || Mount Lemmon Survey ||  || align=right | 3.4 km || 
|-id=595 bgcolor=#E9E9E9
| 496595 ||  || — || November 19, 2009 || Mount Lemmon || Mount Lemmon Survey ||  || align=right | 1.5 km || 
|-id=596 bgcolor=#d6d6d6
| 496596 ||  || — || May 22, 2011 || Mount Lemmon || Mount Lemmon Survey || EMA || align=right | 2.7 km || 
|-id=597 bgcolor=#d6d6d6
| 496597 ||  || — || May 26, 2011 || Mount Lemmon || Mount Lemmon Survey ||  || align=right | 2.7 km || 
|-id=598 bgcolor=#d6d6d6
| 496598 ||  || — || November 6, 2013 || Haleakala || Pan-STARRS || VER || align=right | 2.5 km || 
|-id=599 bgcolor=#E9E9E9
| 496599 ||  || — || February 24, 2006 || Kitt Peak || Spacewatch ||  || align=right | 2.4 km || 
|-id=600 bgcolor=#d6d6d6
| 496600 ||  || — || March 15, 2004 || Kitt Peak || Spacewatch ||  || align=right | 2.7 km || 
|}

496601–496700 

|-bgcolor=#d6d6d6
| 496601 ||  || — || August 17, 2012 || Haleakala || Pan-STARRS ||  || align=right | 3.1 km || 
|-id=602 bgcolor=#fefefe
| 496602 ||  || — || September 14, 2006 || Catalina || CSS ||  || align=right data-sort-value="0.75" | 750 m || 
|-id=603 bgcolor=#d6d6d6
| 496603 ||  || — || December 5, 2002 || Socorro || LINEAR || TIR || align=right | 2.8 km || 
|-id=604 bgcolor=#C2FFFF
| 496604 ||  || — || November 8, 2010 || Mount Lemmon || Mount Lemmon Survey || L4 || align=right | 8.2 km || 
|-id=605 bgcolor=#d6d6d6
| 496605 ||  || — || May 8, 2011 || Kitt Peak || Spacewatch || ELF || align=right | 3.2 km || 
|-id=606 bgcolor=#d6d6d6
| 496606 ||  || — || November 1, 2013 || Mount Lemmon || Mount Lemmon Survey ||  || align=right | 2.8 km || 
|-id=607 bgcolor=#fefefe
| 496607 ||  || — || January 11, 2008 || Mount Lemmon || Mount Lemmon Survey ||  || align=right data-sort-value="0.60" | 600 m || 
|-id=608 bgcolor=#d6d6d6
| 496608 ||  || — || October 13, 2007 || Mount Lemmon || Mount Lemmon Survey ||  || align=right | 3.5 km || 
|-id=609 bgcolor=#d6d6d6
| 496609 ||  || — || December 30, 2008 || Mount Lemmon || Mount Lemmon Survey || EOS || align=right | 3.0 km || 
|-id=610 bgcolor=#d6d6d6
| 496610 ||  || — || November 27, 2013 || Haleakala || Pan-STARRS ||  || align=right | 2.8 km || 
|-id=611 bgcolor=#fefefe
| 496611 ||  || — || February 16, 2004 || Kitt Peak || Spacewatch ||  || align=right data-sort-value="0.57" | 570 m || 
|-id=612 bgcolor=#E9E9E9
| 496612 ||  || — || October 5, 2012 || Haleakala || Pan-STARRS ||  || align=right | 1.7 km || 
|-id=613 bgcolor=#d6d6d6
| 496613 ||  || — || December 4, 2008 || Mount Lemmon || Mount Lemmon Survey ||  || align=right | 2.9 km || 
|-id=614 bgcolor=#d6d6d6
| 496614 ||  || — || September 29, 1995 || Kitt Peak || Spacewatch || VER || align=right | 2.8 km || 
|-id=615 bgcolor=#d6d6d6
| 496615 ||  || — || August 2, 2011 || Haleakala || Pan-STARRS ||  || align=right | 4.0 km || 
|-id=616 bgcolor=#d6d6d6
| 496616 ||  || — || August 26, 2012 || Kitt Peak || Spacewatch || EOS || align=right | 3.0 km || 
|-id=617 bgcolor=#E9E9E9
| 496617 ||  || — || April 28, 2011 || Haleakala || Pan-STARRS ||  || align=right data-sort-value="0.79" | 790 m || 
|-id=618 bgcolor=#C2FFFF
| 496618 ||  || — || October 8, 2008 || Kitt Peak || Spacewatch || L4 || align=right | 6.8 km || 
|-id=619 bgcolor=#d6d6d6
| 496619 ||  || — || November 8, 2007 || Kitt Peak || Spacewatch ||  || align=right | 2.6 km || 
|-id=620 bgcolor=#d6d6d6
| 496620 ||  || — || August 7, 2010 || WISE || WISE || EUP || align=right | 4.5 km || 
|-id=621 bgcolor=#E9E9E9
| 496621 ||  || — || September 16, 2006 || Catalina || CSS ||  || align=right | 2.2 km || 
|-id=622 bgcolor=#E9E9E9
| 496622 ||  || — || October 23, 2011 || Haleakala || Pan-STARRS ||  || align=right | 1.2 km || 
|-id=623 bgcolor=#fefefe
| 496623 ||  || — || September 2, 2008 || Kitt Peak || Spacewatch ||  || align=right data-sort-value="0.67" | 670 m || 
|-id=624 bgcolor=#E9E9E9
| 496624 ||  || — || October 25, 2011 || Haleakala || Pan-STARRS ||  || align=right | 1.3 km || 
|-id=625 bgcolor=#E9E9E9
| 496625 ||  || — || March 6, 2013 || Haleakala || Pan-STARRS ||  || align=right | 1.3 km || 
|-id=626 bgcolor=#d6d6d6
| 496626 ||  || — || October 29, 2010 || Catalina || CSS ||  || align=right | 2.2 km || 
|-id=627 bgcolor=#fefefe
| 496627 ||  || — || September 10, 2007 || Catalina || CSS || H || align=right data-sort-value="0.64" | 640 m || 
|-id=628 bgcolor=#fefefe
| 496628 ||  || — || May 6, 2006 || Mount Lemmon || Mount Lemmon Survey || H || align=right data-sort-value="0.62" | 620 m || 
|-id=629 bgcolor=#E9E9E9
| 496629 ||  || — || October 24, 2011 || Kitt Peak || Spacewatch || (5) || align=right data-sort-value="0.69" | 690 m || 
|-id=630 bgcolor=#d6d6d6
| 496630 ||  || — || October 1, 2005 || Kitt Peak || Spacewatch || KOR || align=right | 1.9 km || 
|-id=631 bgcolor=#E9E9E9
| 496631 ||  || — || October 20, 2011 || Mount Lemmon || Mount Lemmon Survey ||  || align=right data-sort-value="0.93" | 930 m || 
|-id=632 bgcolor=#fefefe
| 496632 ||  || — || March 22, 2009 || Catalina || CSS || H || align=right data-sort-value="0.66" | 660 m || 
|-id=633 bgcolor=#d6d6d6
| 496633 ||  || — || September 13, 1998 || Kitt Peak || Spacewatch ||  || align=right | 2.2 km || 
|-id=634 bgcolor=#d6d6d6
| 496634 ||  || — || February 12, 2011 || Mount Lemmon || Mount Lemmon Survey ||  || align=right | 2.3 km || 
|-id=635 bgcolor=#d6d6d6
| 496635 ||  || — || October 13, 2015 || Haleakala || Pan-STARRS ||  || align=right | 4.0 km || 
|-id=636 bgcolor=#d6d6d6
| 496636 ||  || — || October 12, 2010 || Mount Lemmon || Mount Lemmon Survey ||  || align=right | 2.4 km || 
|-id=637 bgcolor=#E9E9E9
| 496637 ||  || — || November 23, 2006 || Kitt Peak || Spacewatch || HNA || align=right | 1.8 km || 
|-id=638 bgcolor=#E9E9E9
| 496638 ||  || — || October 21, 2006 || Mount Lemmon || Mount Lemmon Survey || MRX || align=right | 1.7 km || 
|-id=639 bgcolor=#fefefe
| 496639 ||  || — || October 6, 2007 || Socorro || LINEAR || H || align=right data-sort-value="0.65" | 650 m || 
|-id=640 bgcolor=#FA8072
| 496640 ||  || — || June 12, 2010 || WISE || WISE || H || align=right data-sort-value="0.53" | 530 m || 
|-id=641 bgcolor=#fefefe
| 496641 ||  || — || March 26, 2003 || Kitt Peak || Spacewatch ||  || align=right data-sort-value="0.54" | 540 m || 
|-id=642 bgcolor=#E9E9E9
| 496642 ||  || — || December 4, 2007 || Kitt Peak || Spacewatch ||  || align=right | 1.1 km || 
|-id=643 bgcolor=#E9E9E9
| 496643 ||  || — || March 21, 2012 || Catalina || CSS || MRX || align=right | 2.5 km || 
|-id=644 bgcolor=#fefefe
| 496644 ||  || — || March 4, 2006 || Desert Eagle || W. K. Y. Yeung ||  || align=right | 1.1 km || 
|-id=645 bgcolor=#fefefe
| 496645 ||  || — || March 3, 2005 || Kitt Peak || Spacewatch || NYS || align=right data-sort-value="0.77" | 770 m || 
|-id=646 bgcolor=#fefefe
| 496646 ||  || — || January 15, 2009 || Kitt Peak || Spacewatch ||  || align=right data-sort-value="0.96" | 960 m || 
|-id=647 bgcolor=#E9E9E9
| 496647 ||  || — || November 22, 2014 || Haleakala || Pan-STARRS ||  || align=right | 1.7 km || 
|-id=648 bgcolor=#fefefe
| 496648 ||  || — || September 25, 2006 || Mount Lemmon || Mount Lemmon Survey ||  || align=right | 1.0 km || 
|-id=649 bgcolor=#E9E9E9
| 496649 ||  || — || October 17, 2010 || Mount Lemmon || Mount Lemmon Survey ||  || align=right | 1.3 km || 
|-id=650 bgcolor=#fefefe
| 496650 ||  || — || January 25, 2009 || Kitt Peak || Spacewatch ||  || align=right data-sort-value="0.60" | 600 m || 
|-id=651 bgcolor=#d6d6d6
| 496651 ||  || — || February 15, 2010 || Catalina || CSS ||  || align=right | 2.9 km || 
|-id=652 bgcolor=#d6d6d6
| 496652 ||  || — || April 6, 2011 || Mount Lemmon || Mount Lemmon Survey ||  || align=right | 3.5 km || 
|-id=653 bgcolor=#fefefe
| 496653 ||  || — || September 22, 2006 || Anderson Mesa || LONEOS || H || align=right | 1.0 km || 
|-id=654 bgcolor=#d6d6d6
| 496654 ||  || — || May 29, 2012 || Mount Lemmon || Mount Lemmon Survey ||  || align=right | 2.7 km || 
|-id=655 bgcolor=#E9E9E9
| 496655 ||  || — || June 6, 2008 || Kitt Peak || Spacewatch ||  || align=right | 2.6 km || 
|-id=656 bgcolor=#d6d6d6
| 496656 ||  || — || October 25, 2009 || Mount Lemmon || Mount Lemmon Survey ||  || align=right | 2.7 km || 
|-id=657 bgcolor=#E9E9E9
| 496657 ||  || — || July 15, 2004 || Siding Spring || SSS ||  || align=right | 2.2 km || 
|-id=658 bgcolor=#fefefe
| 496658 ||  || — || August 30, 2011 || Haleakala || Pan-STARRS ||  || align=right data-sort-value="0.87" | 870 m || 
|-id=659 bgcolor=#fefefe
| 496659 ||  || — || March 20, 1993 || Kitt Peak || Spacewatch ||  || align=right data-sort-value="0.89" | 890 m || 
|-id=660 bgcolor=#fefefe
| 496660 ||  || — || January 15, 2005 || Kitt Peak || Spacewatch || MAS || align=right data-sort-value="0.66" | 660 m || 
|-id=661 bgcolor=#E9E9E9
| 496661 ||  || — || April 7, 2008 || Catalina || CSS ||  || align=right | 1.5 km || 
|-id=662 bgcolor=#fefefe
| 496662 ||  || — || October 28, 2011 || Mount Lemmon || Mount Lemmon Survey ||  || align=right data-sort-value="0.59" | 590 m || 
|-id=663 bgcolor=#E9E9E9
| 496663 ||  || — || September 4, 2000 || Kitt Peak || Spacewatch || MRX || align=right | 2.0 km || 
|-id=664 bgcolor=#E9E9E9
| 496664 ||  || — || February 10, 1996 || Kitt Peak || Spacewatch ||  || align=right data-sort-value="0.84" | 840 m || 
|-id=665 bgcolor=#E9E9E9
| 496665 ||  || — || May 11, 2004 || Catalina || CSS ||  || align=right | 2.2 km || 
|-id=666 bgcolor=#E9E9E9
| 496666 ||  || — || June 7, 2013 || Haleakala || Pan-STARRS ||  || align=right data-sort-value="0.72" | 720 m || 
|-id=667 bgcolor=#E9E9E9
| 496667 ||  || — || October 9, 2005 || Kitt Peak || Spacewatch ||  || align=right | 2.2 km || 
|-id=668 bgcolor=#E9E9E9
| 496668 ||  || — || September 11, 2010 || Mount Lemmon || Mount Lemmon Survey || AGNcritical || align=right | 1.3 km || 
|-id=669 bgcolor=#d6d6d6
| 496669 ||  || — || November 1, 2007 || Kitt Peak || Spacewatch || 7:4 || align=right | 4.1 km || 
|-id=670 bgcolor=#E9E9E9
| 496670 ||  || — || January 2, 2011 || Mount Lemmon || Mount Lemmon Survey ||  || align=right | 1.8 km || 
|-id=671 bgcolor=#E9E9E9
| 496671 ||  || — || October 14, 2014 || Kitt Peak || Spacewatch ||  || align=right | 1.1 km || 
|-id=672 bgcolor=#fefefe
| 496672 ||  || — || April 2, 2009 || Kitt Peak || Spacewatch ||  || align=right data-sort-value="0.77" | 770 m || 
|-id=673 bgcolor=#E9E9E9
| 496673 ||  || — || April 22, 2012 || Kitt Peak || Spacewatch ||  || align=right | 2.0 km || 
|-id=674 bgcolor=#d6d6d6
| 496674 ||  || — || March 14, 2011 || Haleakala || Pan-STARRS ||  || align=right | 2.6 km || 
|-id=675 bgcolor=#E9E9E9
| 496675 ||  || — || November 5, 2010 || Kitt Peak || Spacewatch ||  || align=right | 1.8 km || 
|-id=676 bgcolor=#E9E9E9
| 496676 ||  || — || February 13, 2008 || Mount Lemmon || Mount Lemmon Survey ||  || align=right | 1.2 km || 
|-id=677 bgcolor=#E9E9E9
| 496677 ||  || — || September 18, 1995 || Kitt Peak || Spacewatch ||  || align=right | 2.0 km || 
|-id=678 bgcolor=#d6d6d6
| 496678 ||  || — || December 10, 2014 || Mount Lemmon || Mount Lemmon Survey ||  || align=right | 3.1 km || 
|-id=679 bgcolor=#E9E9E9
| 496679 ||  || — || October 16, 2009 || Mount Lemmon || Mount Lemmon Survey ||  || align=right | 1.8 km || 
|-id=680 bgcolor=#fefefe
| 496680 ||  || — || October 2, 2014 || Haleakala || Pan-STARRS ||  || align=right data-sort-value="0.73" | 730 m || 
|-id=681 bgcolor=#fefefe
| 496681 ||  || — || May 26, 2006 || Mount Lemmon || Mount Lemmon Survey ||  || align=right | 1.0 km || 
|-id=682 bgcolor=#fefefe
| 496682 ||  || — || November 21, 2008 || Mount Lemmon || Mount Lemmon Survey ||  || align=right data-sort-value="0.53" | 530 m || 
|-id=683 bgcolor=#E9E9E9
| 496683 ||  || — || April 19, 2007 || Mount Lemmon || Mount Lemmon Survey ||  || align=right | 3.0 km || 
|-id=684 bgcolor=#E9E9E9
| 496684 ||  || — || September 3, 2010 || Mount Lemmon || Mount Lemmon Survey ||  || align=right data-sort-value="0.87" | 870 m || 
|-id=685 bgcolor=#E9E9E9
| 496685 ||  || — || November 16, 2010 || Catalina || CSS || HNS || align=right | 2.1 km || 
|-id=686 bgcolor=#fefefe
| 496686 ||  || — || November 5, 2007 || Kitt Peak || Spacewatch ||  || align=right data-sort-value="0.91" | 910 m || 
|-id=687 bgcolor=#d6d6d6
| 496687 ||  || — || March 31, 2011 || Haleakala || Pan-STARRS ||  || align=right | 2.5 km || 
|-id=688 bgcolor=#E9E9E9
| 496688 ||  || — || May 12, 2012 || Haleakala || Pan-STARRS ||  || align=right | 2.6 km || 
|-id=689 bgcolor=#E9E9E9
| 496689 ||  || — || May 21, 2012 || Haleakala || Pan-STARRS ||  || align=right | 2.4 km || 
|-id=690 bgcolor=#d6d6d6
| 496690 ||  || — || April 2, 2011 || Haleakala || Pan-STARRS ||  || align=right | 2.5 km || 
|-id=691 bgcolor=#d6d6d6
| 496691 ||  || — || April 19, 2006 || Kitt Peak || Spacewatch ||  || align=right | 4.1 km || 
|-id=692 bgcolor=#d6d6d6
| 496692 ||  || — || January 17, 2015 || Mount Lemmon || Mount Lemmon Survey ||  || align=right | 2.8 km || 
|-id=693 bgcolor=#d6d6d6
| 496693 ||  || — || April 28, 2011 || Haleakala || Pan-STARRS || VER || align=right | 2.6 km || 
|-id=694 bgcolor=#d6d6d6
| 496694 ||  || — || October 11, 2007 || Kitt Peak || Spacewatch ||  || align=right | 3.0 km || 
|-id=695 bgcolor=#fefefe
| 496695 ||  || — || December 31, 2007 || Mount Lemmon || Mount Lemmon Survey ||  || align=right data-sort-value="0.73" | 730 m || 
|-id=696 bgcolor=#E9E9E9
| 496696 ||  || — || August 28, 2013 || Mount Lemmon || Mount Lemmon Survey ||  || align=right | 1.8 km || 
|-id=697 bgcolor=#d6d6d6
| 496697 ||  || — || August 15, 2013 || Haleakala || Pan-STARRS ||  || align=right | 2.2 km || 
|-id=698 bgcolor=#d6d6d6
| 496698 ||  || — || October 7, 2004 || Kitt Peak || Spacewatch || KOR || align=right | 2.1 km || 
|-id=699 bgcolor=#d6d6d6
| 496699 ||  || — || September 11, 2007 || Kitt Peak || Spacewatch ||  || align=right | 3.0 km || 
|-id=700 bgcolor=#E9E9E9
| 496700 ||  || — || October 17, 2010 || Mount Lemmon || Mount Lemmon Survey ||  || align=right data-sort-value="0.84" | 840 m || 
|}

496701–496800 

|-bgcolor=#d6d6d6
| 496701 ||  || — || September 17, 2003 || Kitt Peak || Spacewatch ||  || align=right | 2.1 km || 
|-id=702 bgcolor=#d6d6d6
| 496702 ||  || — || September 10, 2007 || Mount Lemmon || Mount Lemmon Survey || THM || align=right | 2.7 km || 
|-id=703 bgcolor=#fefefe
| 496703 ||  || — || February 13, 2012 || Haleakala || Pan-STARRS ||  || align=right data-sort-value="0.69" | 690 m || 
|-id=704 bgcolor=#E9E9E9
| 496704 ||  || — || February 25, 2012 || Mount Lemmon || Mount Lemmon Survey ||  || align=right | 1.6 km || 
|-id=705 bgcolor=#d6d6d6
| 496705 ||  || — || October 4, 2007 || Mount Lemmon || Mount Lemmon Survey || VER || align=right | 3.3 km || 
|-id=706 bgcolor=#E9E9E9
| 496706 ||  || — || September 24, 1960 || Palomar || PLS || KON || align=right data-sort-value="0.91" | 910 m || 
|-id=707 bgcolor=#d6d6d6
| 496707 ||  || — || March 2, 2006 || Kitt Peak || Spacewatch || KOR || align=right | 1.9 km || 
|-id=708 bgcolor=#E9E9E9
| 496708 ||  || — || January 27, 2003 || Anderson Mesa || LONEOS ||  || align=right | 1.7 km || 
|-id=709 bgcolor=#E9E9E9
| 496709 ||  || — || February 27, 2012 || Haleakala || Pan-STARRS ||  || align=right | 1.0 km || 
|-id=710 bgcolor=#E9E9E9
| 496710 ||  || — || July 14, 2013 || Haleakala || Pan-STARRS ||  || align=right data-sort-value="0.93" | 930 m || 
|-id=711 bgcolor=#fefefe
| 496711 ||  || — || January 3, 2009 || Mount Lemmon || Mount Lemmon Survey ||  || align=right data-sort-value="0.63" | 630 m || 
|-id=712 bgcolor=#d6d6d6
| 496712 ||  || — || November 27, 2014 || Haleakala || Pan-STARRS ||  || align=right | 2.1 km || 
|-id=713 bgcolor=#d6d6d6
| 496713 ||  || — || December 1, 2008 || Kitt Peak || Spacewatch ||  || align=right | 3.8 km || 
|-id=714 bgcolor=#d6d6d6
| 496714 ||  || — || January 11, 2010 || Mount Lemmon || Mount Lemmon Survey ||  || align=right | 4.1 km || 
|-id=715 bgcolor=#d6d6d6
| 496715 ||  || — || April 10, 2005 || Kitt Peak || Spacewatch || THM || align=right | 3.4 km || 
|-id=716 bgcolor=#E9E9E9
| 496716 ||  || — || November 10, 2005 || Mount Lemmon || Mount Lemmon Survey ||  || align=right | 2.0 km || 
|-id=717 bgcolor=#E9E9E9
| 496717 ||  || — || January 7, 2006 || Mount Lemmon || Mount Lemmon Survey ||  || align=right | 1.7 km || 
|-id=718 bgcolor=#d6d6d6
| 496718 ||  || — || April 24, 2011 || Mount Lemmon || Mount Lemmon Survey ||  || align=right | 2.7 km || 
|-id=719 bgcolor=#fefefe
| 496719 ||  || — || April 30, 2006 || Kitt Peak || Spacewatch ||  || align=right data-sort-value="0.68" | 680 m || 
|-id=720 bgcolor=#E9E9E9
| 496720 ||  || — || August 29, 2005 || Kitt Peak || Spacewatch ||  || align=right | 1.4 km || 
|-id=721 bgcolor=#fefefe
| 496721 ||  || — || February 2, 2008 || Mount Lemmon || Mount Lemmon Survey ||  || align=right data-sort-value="0.59" | 590 m || 
|-id=722 bgcolor=#E9E9E9
| 496722 ||  || — || October 30, 2010 || Mount Lemmon || Mount Lemmon Survey ||  || align=right | 1.2 km || 
|-id=723 bgcolor=#E9E9E9
| 496723 ||  || — || April 16, 2004 || Kitt Peak || Spacewatch ||  || align=right data-sort-value="0.75" | 750 m || 
|-id=724 bgcolor=#E9E9E9
| 496724 ||  || — || November 13, 2010 || Kitt Peak || Spacewatch ||  || align=right data-sort-value="0.72" | 720 m || 
|-id=725 bgcolor=#d6d6d6
| 496725 ||  || — || April 6, 2005 || Mount Lemmon || Mount Lemmon Survey ||  || align=right | 2.9 km || 
|-id=726 bgcolor=#d6d6d6
| 496726 ||  || — || October 30, 2002 || Kitt Peak || Spacewatch ||  || align=right | 2.3 km || 
|-id=727 bgcolor=#E9E9E9
| 496727 ||  || — || July 14, 2013 || Haleakala || Pan-STARRS ||  || align=right data-sort-value="0.73" | 730 m || 
|-id=728 bgcolor=#fefefe
| 496728 ||  || — || September 12, 1994 || Kitt Peak || Spacewatch ||  || align=right data-sort-value="0.62" | 620 m || 
|-id=729 bgcolor=#E9E9E9
| 496729 ||  || — || April 24, 2012 || Haleakala || Pan-STARRS || HNS || align=right | 1.7 km || 
|-id=730 bgcolor=#d6d6d6
| 496730 ||  || — || March 6, 1999 || Kitt Peak || Spacewatch || EOS || align=right | 3.5 km || 
|-id=731 bgcolor=#E9E9E9
| 496731 ||  || — || January 26, 2006 || Mount Lemmon || Mount Lemmon Survey ||  || align=right | 2.6 km || 
|-id=732 bgcolor=#E9E9E9
| 496732 ||  || — || April 30, 2003 || Kitt Peak || Spacewatch ||  || align=right | 1.6 km || 
|-id=733 bgcolor=#E9E9E9
| 496733 ||  || — || October 1, 2009 || Mount Lemmon || Mount Lemmon Survey ||  || align=right | 1.6 km || 
|-id=734 bgcolor=#d6d6d6
| 496734 ||  || — || October 4, 2007 || Kitt Peak || Spacewatch ||  || align=right | 4.3 km || 
|-id=735 bgcolor=#E9E9E9
| 496735 ||  || — || October 7, 2004 || Kitt Peak || Spacewatch || HOF || align=right | 2.0 km || 
|-id=736 bgcolor=#E9E9E9
| 496736 ||  || — || September 20, 2009 || Mount Lemmon || Mount Lemmon Survey ||  || align=right | 2.7 km || 
|-id=737 bgcolor=#d6d6d6
| 496737 ||  || — || September 28, 2008 || Mount Lemmon || Mount Lemmon Survey ||  || align=right | 2.7 km || 
|-id=738 bgcolor=#d6d6d6
| 496738 ||  || — || October 18, 2003 || Kitt Peak || Spacewatch || KOR || align=right | 2.3 km || 
|-id=739 bgcolor=#d6d6d6
| 496739 ||  || — || October 21, 1997 || Kitt Peak || Spacewatch ||  || align=right | 3.7 km || 
|-id=740 bgcolor=#E9E9E9
| 496740 ||  || — || February 2, 2006 || Kitt Peak || Spacewatch || HOF || align=right | 3.1 km || 
|-id=741 bgcolor=#d6d6d6
| 496741 ||  || — || September 20, 2007 || Kitt Peak || Spacewatch ||  || align=right | 2.6 km || 
|-id=742 bgcolor=#d6d6d6
| 496742 ||  || — || March 13, 2010 || Catalina || CSS ||  || align=right | 3.5 km || 
|-id=743 bgcolor=#d6d6d6
| 496743 ||  || — || December 17, 2014 || Haleakala || Pan-STARRS ||  || align=right | 2.8 km || 
|-id=744 bgcolor=#d6d6d6
| 496744 ||  || — || August 13, 2012 || Kitt Peak || Spacewatch ||  || align=right | 2.8 km || 
|-id=745 bgcolor=#d6d6d6
| 496745 ||  || — || November 17, 2008 || Kitt Peak || Spacewatch || LIX || align=right | 2.7 km || 
|-id=746 bgcolor=#d6d6d6
| 496746 ||  || — || October 6, 2008 || Kitt Peak || Spacewatch ||  || align=right | 2.4 km || 
|-id=747 bgcolor=#d6d6d6
| 496747 ||  || — || December 25, 2013 || Mount Lemmon || Mount Lemmon Survey ||  || align=right | 3.4 km || 
|-id=748 bgcolor=#d6d6d6
| 496748 ||  || — || January 10, 2014 || Mount Lemmon || Mount Lemmon Survey ||  || align=right | 3.0 km || 
|-id=749 bgcolor=#E9E9E9
| 496749 ||  || — || March 3, 2005 || Catalina || CSS ||  || align=right | 2.7 km || 
|-id=750 bgcolor=#fefefe
| 496750 ||  || — || September 28, 2006 || Kitt Peak || Spacewatch ||  || align=right data-sort-value="0.65" | 650 m || 
|-id=751 bgcolor=#d6d6d6
| 496751 ||  || — || July 5, 2011 || Haleakala || Pan-STARRS ||  || align=right | 3.6 km || 
|-id=752 bgcolor=#d6d6d6
| 496752 ||  || — || September 13, 2005 || Kitt Peak || Spacewatch ||  || align=right | 2.9 km || 
|-id=753 bgcolor=#d6d6d6
| 496753 ||  || — || September 1, 2010 || Mount Lemmon || Mount Lemmon Survey ||  || align=right | 2.5 km || 
|-id=754 bgcolor=#E9E9E9
| 496754 ||  || — || November 7, 2007 || Kitt Peak || Spacewatch ||  || align=right | 2.0 km || 
|-id=755 bgcolor=#E9E9E9
| 496755 ||  || — || September 11, 2007 || Mount Lemmon || Mount Lemmon Survey ||  || align=right | 1.9 km || 
|-id=756 bgcolor=#d6d6d6
| 496756 ||  || — || October 26, 2005 || Kitt Peak || Spacewatch ||  || align=right | 2.0 km || 
|-id=757 bgcolor=#d6d6d6
| 496757 ||  || — || September 30, 2005 || Mount Lemmon || Mount Lemmon Survey ||  || align=right | 2.0 km || 
|-id=758 bgcolor=#d6d6d6
| 496758 ||  || — || October 1, 2005 || Mount Lemmon || Mount Lemmon Survey || THM || align=right | 2.2 km || 
|-id=759 bgcolor=#fefefe
| 496759 ||  || — || December 28, 2005 || Mount Lemmon || Mount Lemmon Survey || NYS || align=right data-sort-value="0.54" | 540 m || 
|-id=760 bgcolor=#d6d6d6
| 496760 ||  || — || November 11, 2005 || Kitt Peak || Spacewatch || HYG || align=right | 2.7 km || 
|-id=761 bgcolor=#E9E9E9
| 496761 ||  || — || April 24, 2006 || Kitt Peak || Spacewatch ||  || align=right | 1.3 km || 
|-id=762 bgcolor=#fefefe
| 496762 ||  || — || October 28, 2005 || Mount Lemmon || Mount Lemmon Survey || MAS || align=right data-sort-value="0.56" | 560 m || 
|-id=763 bgcolor=#d6d6d6
| 496763 ||  || — || October 31, 2005 || Catalina || CSS ||  || align=right | 3.4 km || 
|-id=764 bgcolor=#d6d6d6
| 496764 ||  || — || February 4, 2012 || Haleakala || Pan-STARRS ||  || align=right | 3.0 km || 
|-id=765 bgcolor=#E9E9E9
| 496765 ||  || — || December 30, 2007 || Kitt Peak || Spacewatch || WIT || align=right | 1.5 km || 
|-id=766 bgcolor=#E9E9E9
| 496766 ||  || — || October 2, 2006 || Mount Lemmon || Mount Lemmon Survey ||  || align=right | 1.9 km || 
|-id=767 bgcolor=#d6d6d6
| 496767 ||  || — || October 7, 2004 || Kitt Peak || Spacewatch || THM || align=right | 2.4 km || 
|-id=768 bgcolor=#fefefe
| 496768 ||  || — || February 20, 2006 || Socorro || LINEAR ||  || align=right | 1.7 km || 
|-id=769 bgcolor=#E9E9E9
| 496769 ||  || — || April 13, 2004 || Kitt Peak || Spacewatch || AGN || align=right | 1.9 km || 
|-id=770 bgcolor=#E9E9E9
| 496770 ||  || — || March 14, 2004 || Kitt Peak || Spacewatch || MRX || align=right | 1.9 km || 
|-id=771 bgcolor=#d6d6d6
| 496771 ||  || — || January 8, 1999 || Kitt Peak || Spacewatch ||  || align=right | 3.7 km || 
|-id=772 bgcolor=#d6d6d6
| 496772 ||  || — || March 14, 2007 || Mount Lemmon || Mount Lemmon Survey ||  || align=right | 3.5 km || 
|-id=773 bgcolor=#fefefe
| 496773 ||  || — || September 8, 2008 || Kitt Peak || Spacewatch ||  || align=right data-sort-value="0.75" | 750 m || 
|-id=774 bgcolor=#fefefe
| 496774 ||  || — || October 10, 2008 || Mount Lemmon || Mount Lemmon Survey ||  || align=right data-sort-value="0.90" | 900 m || 
|-id=775 bgcolor=#fefefe
| 496775 ||  || — || December 14, 2001 || Kitt Peak || Spacewatch ||  || align=right | 1.2 km || 
|-id=776 bgcolor=#E9E9E9
| 496776 ||  || — || February 27, 2009 || Mount Lemmon || Mount Lemmon Survey ||  || align=right | 1.4 km || 
|-id=777 bgcolor=#E9E9E9
| 496777 ||  || — || September 17, 2006 || Kitt Peak || Spacewatch ||  || align=right | 1.7 km || 
|-id=778 bgcolor=#E9E9E9
| 496778 ||  || — || November 17, 2007 || Catalina || CSS ||  || align=right | 1.0 km || 
|-id=779 bgcolor=#d6d6d6
| 496779 ||  || — || December 11, 2010 || Mount Lemmon || Mount Lemmon Survey ||  || align=right | 2.8 km || 
|-id=780 bgcolor=#fefefe
| 496780 ||  || — || August 11, 2012 || Haleakala || Pan-STARRS || H || align=right data-sort-value="0.75" | 750 m || 
|-id=781 bgcolor=#d6d6d6
| 496781 ||  || — || March 23, 2001 || Kitt Peak || Spacewatch ||  || align=right | 3.7 km || 
|-id=782 bgcolor=#d6d6d6
| 496782 ||  || — || January 28, 2011 || Kitt Peak || Spacewatch ||  || align=right | 3.3 km || 
|-id=783 bgcolor=#E9E9E9
| 496783 ||  || — || August 29, 2002 || Kitt Peak || Spacewatch || MAR || align=right | 1.2 km || 
|-id=784 bgcolor=#d6d6d6
| 496784 ||  || — || January 6, 2006 || Kitt Peak || Spacewatch ||  || align=right | 2.8 km || 
|-id=785 bgcolor=#d6d6d6
| 496785 ||  || — || February 25, 2006 || Kitt Peak || Spacewatch ||  || align=right | 2.1 km || 
|-id=786 bgcolor=#fefefe
| 496786 ||  || — || August 21, 2008 || Kitt Peak || Spacewatch ||  || align=right data-sort-value="0.82" | 820 m || 
|-id=787 bgcolor=#fefefe
| 496787 ||  || — || March 20, 2010 || Mount Lemmon || Mount Lemmon Survey ||  || align=right data-sort-value="0.64" | 640 m || 
|-id=788 bgcolor=#fefefe
| 496788 ||  || — || September 18, 2007 || Siding Spring || SSS || H || align=right data-sort-value="0.73" | 730 m || 
|-id=789 bgcolor=#fefefe
| 496789 ||  || — || April 24, 2003 || Kitt Peak || Spacewatch ||  || align=right data-sort-value="0.57" | 570 m || 
|-id=790 bgcolor=#fefefe
| 496790 ||  || — || February 21, 2006 || Catalina || CSS ||  || align=right data-sort-value="0.75" | 750 m || 
|-id=791 bgcolor=#d6d6d6
| 496791 ||  || — || April 25, 2000 || Kitt Peak || Spacewatch || VER || align=right | 3.2 km || 
|-id=792 bgcolor=#E9E9E9
| 496792 ||  || — || November 20, 2006 || Kitt Peak || Spacewatch ||  || align=right | 2.6 km || 
|-id=793 bgcolor=#E9E9E9
| 496793 ||  || — || October 2, 2010 || Mount Lemmon || Mount Lemmon Survey ||  || align=right | 2.2 km || 
|-id=794 bgcolor=#fefefe
| 496794 ||  || — || October 24, 2014 || Mount Lemmon || Mount Lemmon Survey ||  || align=right data-sort-value="0.62" | 620 m || 
|-id=795 bgcolor=#d6d6d6
| 496795 ||  || — || April 29, 2006 || Kitt Peak || Spacewatch || EOS || align=right | 3.3 km || 
|-id=796 bgcolor=#fefefe
| 496796 ||  || — || August 10, 2010 || Kitt Peak || Spacewatch ||  || align=right data-sort-value="0.82" | 820 m || 
|-id=797 bgcolor=#fefefe
| 496797 ||  || — || December 29, 2008 || Mount Lemmon || Mount Lemmon Survey ||  || align=right | 1.0 km || 
|-id=798 bgcolor=#d6d6d6
| 496798 ||  || — || April 14, 2007 || Kitt Peak || Spacewatch || LAU || align=right | 2.2 km || 
|-id=799 bgcolor=#E9E9E9
| 496799 ||  || — || February 29, 2000 || Socorro || LINEAR ||  || align=right | 1.2 km || 
|-id=800 bgcolor=#E9E9E9
| 496800 ||  || — || February 14, 2013 || Haleakala || Pan-STARRS ||  || align=right | 1.4 km || 
|}

496801–496900 

|-bgcolor=#fefefe
| 496801 ||  || — || March 27, 2014 || Haleakala || Pan-STARRS || H || align=right data-sort-value="0.86" | 860 m || 
|-id=802 bgcolor=#E9E9E9
| 496802 ||  || — || October 30, 2005 || Kitt Peak || Spacewatch ||  || align=right | 1.4 km || 
|-id=803 bgcolor=#d6d6d6
| 496803 ||  || — || March 12, 2010 || WISE || WISE ||  || align=right | 4.9 km || 
|-id=804 bgcolor=#fefefe
| 496804 ||  || — || November 20, 2008 || Mount Lemmon || Mount Lemmon Survey || H || align=right data-sort-value="0.59" | 590 m || 
|-id=805 bgcolor=#fefefe
| 496805 ||  || — || July 15, 2004 || Siding Spring || SSS || H || align=right data-sort-value="0.75" | 750 m || 
|-id=806 bgcolor=#d6d6d6
| 496806 ||  || — || August 22, 1995 || Kitt Peak || Spacewatch ||  || align=right | 3.7 km || 
|-id=807 bgcolor=#E9E9E9
| 496807 ||  || — || January 30, 2012 || Mount Lemmon || Mount Lemmon Survey || MAR || align=right | 2.2 km || 
|-id=808 bgcolor=#d6d6d6
| 496808 ||  || — || December 11, 2004 || Kitt Peak || Spacewatch ||  || align=right | 4.4 km || 
|-id=809 bgcolor=#fefefe
| 496809 ||  || — || March 5, 2013 || Haleakala || Pan-STARRS ||  || align=right data-sort-value="0.91" | 910 m || 
|-id=810 bgcolor=#fefefe
| 496810 ||  || — || June 20, 2012 || Kitt Peak || Spacewatch || H || align=right data-sort-value="0.82" | 820 m || 
|-id=811 bgcolor=#FA8072
| 496811 ||  || — || December 28, 2007 || Kitt Peak || Spacewatch || H || align=right data-sort-value="0.90" | 900 m || 
|-id=812 bgcolor=#d6d6d6
| 496812 ||  || — || December 13, 2009 || Mount Lemmon || Mount Lemmon Survey ||  || align=right | 3.0 km || 
|-id=813 bgcolor=#fefefe
| 496813 ||  || — || November 24, 2003 || Kitt Peak || Spacewatch || SVE || align=right | 1.1 km || 
|-id=814 bgcolor=#E9E9E9
| 496814 ||  || — || March 24, 2003 || Kitt Peak || Spacewatch ||  || align=right | 2.7 km || 
|-id=815 bgcolor=#d6d6d6
| 496815 ||  || — || October 18, 2007 || Kitt Peak || Spacewatch ||  || align=right | 3.2 km || 
|-id=816 bgcolor=#FFC2E0
| 496816 ||  || — || October 27, 1989 || Steward || D. L. Rabinowitz, J. V. Scotti || APOPHAcritical || align=right data-sort-value="0.3" | 300 m || 
|-id=817 bgcolor=#FFC2E0
| 496817 ||  || — || November 1, 1989 || Siding Spring || Q. A. Parker || APOPHA || align=right data-sort-value="0.4" | 400 m || 
|-id=818 bgcolor=#FFC2E0
| 496818 ||  || — || September 9, 1993 || Kitt Peak || Spacewatch || AMO || align=right data-sort-value="0.49" | 490 m || 
|-id=819 bgcolor=#FA8072
| 496819 ||  || — || December 2, 1994 || Kitt Peak || Spacewatch ||  || align=right data-sort-value="0.71" | 710 m || 
|-id=820 bgcolor=#E9E9E9
| 496820 ||  || — || March 27, 1995 || Kitt Peak || Spacewatch ||  || align=right data-sort-value="0.89" | 890 m || 
|-id=821 bgcolor=#E9E9E9
| 496821 ||  || — || July 22, 1995 || Kitt Peak || Spacewatch ||  || align=right | 1.2 km || 
|-id=822 bgcolor=#d6d6d6
| 496822 ||  || — || July 27, 1995 || Kitt Peak || Spacewatch ||  || align=right | 2.6 km || 
|-id=823 bgcolor=#d6d6d6
| 496823 ||  || — || August 28, 1995 || Kitt Peak || Spacewatch ||  || align=right | 2.1 km || 
|-id=824 bgcolor=#d6d6d6
| 496824 ||  || — || September 19, 1995 || Kitt Peak || Spacewatch || EUP || align=right | 3.9 km || 
|-id=825 bgcolor=#fefefe
| 496825 ||  || — || September 19, 1995 || Kitt Peak || Spacewatch || NYS || align=right data-sort-value="0.44" | 440 m || 
|-id=826 bgcolor=#d6d6d6
| 496826 ||  || — || September 26, 1995 || Kitt Peak || Spacewatch || THM || align=right | 1.8 km || 
|-id=827 bgcolor=#d6d6d6
| 496827 ||  || — || September 19, 1995 || Kitt Peak || Spacewatch || LIX || align=right | 1.8 km || 
|-id=828 bgcolor=#E9E9E9
| 496828 ||  || — || September 19, 1995 || Kitt Peak || Spacewatch ||  || align=right | 1.9 km || 
|-id=829 bgcolor=#fefefe
| 496829 ||  || — || October 15, 1995 || Kitt Peak || Spacewatch || NYS || align=right data-sort-value="0.52" | 520 m || 
|-id=830 bgcolor=#d6d6d6
| 496830 ||  || — || October 28, 1995 || Kitt Peak || Spacewatch || EUP || align=right | 2.8 km || 
|-id=831 bgcolor=#d6d6d6
| 496831 ||  || — || November 14, 1995 || Kitt Peak || Spacewatch || THM || align=right | 2.1 km || 
|-id=832 bgcolor=#fefefe
| 496832 ||  || — || November 17, 1995 || Kitt Peak || Spacewatch || NYS || align=right data-sort-value="0.48" | 480 m || 
|-id=833 bgcolor=#E9E9E9
| 496833 ||  || — || January 12, 1996 || Kitt Peak || Spacewatch || AGN || align=right | 1.9 km || 
|-id=834 bgcolor=#FA8072
| 496834 ||  || — || October 9, 1996 || Kitt Peak || Spacewatch ||  || align=right data-sort-value="0.26" | 260 m || 
|-id=835 bgcolor=#E9E9E9
| 496835 ||  || — || April 5, 1997 || Mauna Kea || C. Veillet || GEF || align=right data-sort-value="0.97" | 970 m || 
|-id=836 bgcolor=#E9E9E9
| 496836 ||  || — || July 25, 1998 || Prescott || P. G. Comba ||   CLO || align=right | 2.3 km || 
|-id=837 bgcolor=#FFC2E0
| 496837 ||  || — || September 21, 1998 || Socorro || LINEAR || AMO || align=right data-sort-value="0.34" | 340 m || 
|-id=838 bgcolor=#d6d6d6
| 496838 ||  || — || September 24, 1998 || Kitt Peak || Spacewatch || KOR || align=right | 1.1 km || 
|-id=839 bgcolor=#d6d6d6
| 496839 ||  || — || November 26, 1998 || Kitt Peak || Spacewatch || KOR || align=right | 1.2 km || 
|-id=840 bgcolor=#d6d6d6
| 496840 ||  || — || December 25, 1998 || Kitt Peak || Spacewatch ||  || align=right | 3.3 km || 
|-id=841 bgcolor=#d6d6d6
| 496841 ||  || — || February 10, 1999 || Socorro || LINEAR ||  || align=right | 3.0 km || 
|-id=842 bgcolor=#E9E9E9
| 496842 ||  || — || September 8, 1999 || Socorro || LINEAR ||  || align=right | 2.2 km || 
|-id=843 bgcolor=#E9E9E9
| 496843 ||  || — || September 4, 1999 || Kitt Peak || Spacewatch || HOF || align=right | 2.4 km || 
|-id=844 bgcolor=#E9E9E9
| 496844 ||  || — || October 8, 1999 || Kitt Peak || Spacewatch || MRX || align=right data-sort-value="0.93" | 930 m || 
|-id=845 bgcolor=#fefefe
| 496845 ||  || — || October 9, 1999 || Kitt Peak || Spacewatch || MAS || align=right data-sort-value="0.61" | 610 m || 
|-id=846 bgcolor=#fefefe
| 496846 ||  || — || October 4, 1999 || Kitt Peak || Spacewatch ||  || align=right data-sort-value="0.58" | 580 m || 
|-id=847 bgcolor=#E9E9E9
| 496847 ||  || — || October 14, 1999 || Socorro || LINEAR ||  || align=right | 2.4 km || 
|-id=848 bgcolor=#fefefe
| 496848 ||  || — || October 1, 1999 || Kitt Peak || Spacewatch || NYS || align=right data-sort-value="0.62" | 620 m || 
|-id=849 bgcolor=#E9E9E9
| 496849 ||  || — || October 9, 1999 || Kitt Peak || Spacewatch || NEM || align=right | 1.5 km || 
|-id=850 bgcolor=#fefefe
| 496850 ||  || — || October 31, 1999 || Kitt Peak || Spacewatch ||  || align=right data-sort-value="0.64" | 640 m || 
|-id=851 bgcolor=#fefefe
| 496851 ||  || — || October 20, 1999 || Kitt Peak || Spacewatch ||  || align=right data-sort-value="0.67" | 670 m || 
|-id=852 bgcolor=#E9E9E9
| 496852 ||  || — || November 1, 1999 || Kitt Peak || Spacewatch ||  || align=right | 1.8 km || 
|-id=853 bgcolor=#fefefe
| 496853 ||  || — || November 4, 1999 || Kitt Peak || Spacewatch || NYS || align=right data-sort-value="0.59" | 590 m || 
|-id=854 bgcolor=#fefefe
| 496854 ||  || — || November 6, 1999 || Kitt Peak || Spacewatch || MAS || align=right data-sort-value="0.55" | 550 m || 
|-id=855 bgcolor=#fefefe
| 496855 ||  || — || November 4, 1999 || Kitt Peak || Spacewatch ||  || align=right data-sort-value="0.71" | 710 m || 
|-id=856 bgcolor=#fefefe
| 496856 ||  || — || October 30, 1999 || Kitt Peak || Spacewatch || MAS || align=right data-sort-value="0.58" | 580 m || 
|-id=857 bgcolor=#E9E9E9
| 496857 ||  || — || November 12, 1999 || Socorro || LINEAR ||  || align=right | 1.6 km || 
|-id=858 bgcolor=#fefefe
| 496858 ||  || — || November 12, 1999 || Socorro || LINEAR || MAS || align=right data-sort-value="0.57" | 570 m || 
|-id=859 bgcolor=#fefefe
| 496859 ||  || — || November 9, 1999 || Socorro || LINEAR || (5026) || align=right data-sort-value="0.55" | 550 m || 
|-id=860 bgcolor=#FFC2E0
| 496860 ||  || — || December 12, 1999 || Socorro || LINEAR || APOPHA || align=right data-sort-value="0.43" | 430 m || 
|-id=861 bgcolor=#FFC2E0
| 496861 ||  || — || January 27, 2000 || Socorro || LINEAR || APO +1km || align=right data-sort-value="0.89" | 890 m || 
|-id=862 bgcolor=#fefefe
| 496862 ||  || — || January 27, 2000 || Kitt Peak || Spacewatch ||  || align=right data-sort-value="0.75" | 750 m || 
|-id=863 bgcolor=#FA8072
| 496863 ||  || — || February 4, 2000 || Socorro || LINEAR ||  || align=right data-sort-value="0.64" | 640 m || 
|-id=864 bgcolor=#d6d6d6
| 496864 ||  || — || February 5, 2000 || Kitt Peak || M. W. Buie ||  || align=right | 1.9 km || 
|-id=865 bgcolor=#d6d6d6
| 496865 ||  || — || February 29, 2000 || Socorro || LINEAR ||  || align=right | 2.8 km || 
|-id=866 bgcolor=#d6d6d6
| 496866 ||  || — || May 5, 2000 || Prescott || P. G. Comba ||  || align=right | 2.6 km || 
|-id=867 bgcolor=#fefefe
| 496867 ||  || — || May 29, 2000 || Kitt Peak || Spacewatch ||  || align=right data-sort-value="0.56" | 560 m || 
|-id=868 bgcolor=#FA8072
| 496868 ||  || — || July 31, 2000 || Kitt Peak || Spacewatch ||  || align=right data-sort-value="0.71" | 710 m || 
|-id=869 bgcolor=#FFC2E0
| 496869 ||  || — || August 24, 2000 || Socorro || LINEAR || APO +1km || align=right data-sort-value="0.85" | 850 m || 
|-id=870 bgcolor=#d6d6d6
| 496870 ||  || — || August 31, 2000 || Socorro || LINEAR ||  || align=right | 2.8 km || 
|-id=871 bgcolor=#d6d6d6
| 496871 ||  || — || September 1, 2000 || Socorro || LINEAR ||  || align=right | 3.4 km || 
|-id=872 bgcolor=#FA8072
| 496872 ||  || — || September 22, 2000 || Socorro || LINEAR ||  || align=right | 1.4 km || 
|-id=873 bgcolor=#FA8072
| 496873 ||  || — || September 23, 2000 || Socorro || LINEAR ||  || align=right | 2.1 km || 
|-id=874 bgcolor=#FA8072
| 496874 ||  || — || September 5, 2000 || Socorro || LINEAR ||  || align=right data-sort-value="0.68" | 680 m || 
|-id=875 bgcolor=#d6d6d6
| 496875 ||  || — || September 23, 2000 || Socorro || LINEAR || EUP || align=right | 3.5 km || 
|-id=876 bgcolor=#E9E9E9
| 496876 ||  || — || September 6, 2000 || Socorro || LINEAR || BAR || align=right | 2.1 km || 
|-id=877 bgcolor=#E9E9E9
| 496877 ||  || — || September 24, 2000 || Socorro || LINEAR ||  || align=right | 2.5 km || 
|-id=878 bgcolor=#E9E9E9
| 496878 ||  || — || September 24, 2000 || Socorro || LINEAR ||  || align=right | 1.4 km || 
|-id=879 bgcolor=#fefefe
| 496879 ||  || — || September 26, 2000 || Socorro || LINEAR ||  || align=right data-sort-value="0.87" | 870 m || 
|-id=880 bgcolor=#d6d6d6
| 496880 ||  || — || September 4, 2000 || Anderson Mesa || LONEOS || EUP || align=right | 4.5 km || 
|-id=881 bgcolor=#E9E9E9
| 496881 ||  || — || August 10, 2000 || Socorro || LINEAR ||  || align=right | 1.9 km || 
|-id=882 bgcolor=#E9E9E9
| 496882 ||  || — || September 24, 2000 || Anderson Mesa || LONEOS ||  || align=right | 1.3 km || 
|-id=883 bgcolor=#d6d6d6
| 496883 ||  || — || September 22, 2000 || Anderson Mesa || LONEOS || EUP || align=right | 3.5 km || 
|-id=884 bgcolor=#E9E9E9
| 496884 ||  || — || October 2, 2000 || Socorro || LINEAR ||  || align=right | 1.3 km || 
|-id=885 bgcolor=#E9E9E9
| 496885 ||  || — || September 23, 2000 || Anderson Mesa || LONEOS ||  || align=right | 1.4 km || 
|-id=886 bgcolor=#fefefe
| 496886 ||  || — || October 27, 2000 || Kitt Peak || Spacewatch || (2076) || align=right data-sort-value="0.78" | 780 m || 
|-id=887 bgcolor=#fefefe
| 496887 ||  || — || October 29, 2000 || Kitt Peak || Spacewatch ||  || align=right data-sort-value="0.61" | 610 m || 
|-id=888 bgcolor=#E9E9E9
| 496888 ||  || — || October 24, 2000 || Socorro || LINEAR ||  || align=right | 1.8 km || 
|-id=889 bgcolor=#fefefe
| 496889 ||  || — || October 25, 2000 || Socorro || LINEAR ||  || align=right data-sort-value="0.86" | 860 m || 
|-id=890 bgcolor=#FA8072
| 496890 ||  || — || September 30, 2000 || Socorro || LINEAR ||  || align=right data-sort-value="0.89" | 890 m || 
|-id=891 bgcolor=#fefefe
| 496891 ||  || — || November 19, 2000 || Socorro || LINEAR || PHO || align=right | 1.3 km || 
|-id=892 bgcolor=#E9E9E9
| 496892 ||  || — || November 30, 2000 || Kitt Peak || Spacewatch ||  || align=right | 3.8 km || 
|-id=893 bgcolor=#E9E9E9
| 496893 ||  || — || November 19, 2000 || Socorro || LINEAR ||  || align=right | 1.6 km || 
|-id=894 bgcolor=#E9E9E9
| 496894 ||  || — || December 30, 2000 || Kitt Peak || Spacewatch ||  || align=right | 1.7 km || 
|-id=895 bgcolor=#FA8072
| 496895 ||  || — || January 15, 2001 || Socorro || LINEAR ||  || align=right | 1.2 km || 
|-id=896 bgcolor=#FA8072
| 496896 ||  || — || January 4, 2001 || Socorro || LINEAR ||  || align=right | 2.1 km || 
|-id=897 bgcolor=#FA8072
| 496897 ||  || — || January 19, 2001 || Anderson Mesa || LONEOS ||  || align=right data-sort-value="0.42" | 420 m || 
|-id=898 bgcolor=#E9E9E9
| 496898 ||  || — || February 13, 2001 || Kitt Peak || Spacewatch ||  || align=right | 2.3 km || 
|-id=899 bgcolor=#fefefe
| 496899 ||  || — || March 27, 2001 || Haleakala || NEAT || PHO || align=right | 1.1 km || 
|-id=900 bgcolor=#fefefe
| 496900 ||  || — || March 21, 2001 || Kitt Peak || SKADS || MAS || align=right data-sort-value="0.65" | 650 m || 
|}

496901–497000 

|-bgcolor=#FFC2E0
| 496901 ||  || — || April 16, 2001 || Anderson Mesa || LONEOS || APOPHA || align=right data-sort-value="0.30" | 300 m || 
|-id=902 bgcolor=#d6d6d6
| 496902 ||  || — || August 19, 2001 || Socorro || LINEAR ||  || align=right | 2.5 km || 
|-id=903 bgcolor=#d6d6d6
| 496903 ||  || — || August 21, 2001 || Kitt Peak || Spacewatch ||  || align=right | 2.2 km || 
|-id=904 bgcolor=#d6d6d6
| 496904 ||  || — || August 25, 2001 || Socorro || LINEAR ||  || align=right | 2.3 km || 
|-id=905 bgcolor=#E9E9E9
| 496905 ||  || — || August 23, 2001 || Anderson Mesa || LONEOS ||  || align=right data-sort-value="0.99" | 990 m || 
|-id=906 bgcolor=#d6d6d6
| 496906 ||  || — || August 23, 2001 || Anderson Mesa || LONEOS ||  || align=right | 2.6 km || 
|-id=907 bgcolor=#E9E9E9
| 496907 ||  || — || August 24, 2001 || Anderson Mesa || LONEOS ||  || align=right data-sort-value="0.92" | 920 m || 
|-id=908 bgcolor=#d6d6d6
| 496908 ||  || — || August 24, 2001 || Socorro || LINEAR || 3:2 || align=right | 5.1 km || 
|-id=909 bgcolor=#E9E9E9
| 496909 ||  || — || September 12, 2001 || Socorro || LINEAR ||  || align=right data-sort-value="0.71" | 710 m || 
|-id=910 bgcolor=#d6d6d6
| 496910 ||  || — || September 19, 2001 || Socorro || LINEAR ||  || align=right | 3.3 km || 
|-id=911 bgcolor=#d6d6d6
| 496911 ||  || — || September 16, 2001 || Kitt Peak || Spacewatch || TIR || align=right | 2.6 km || 
|-id=912 bgcolor=#fefefe
| 496912 ||  || — || September 19, 2001 || Socorro || LINEAR ||  || align=right data-sort-value="0.60" | 600 m || 
|-id=913 bgcolor=#d6d6d6
| 496913 ||  || — || September 19, 2001 || Socorro || LINEAR ||  || align=right | 2.3 km || 
|-id=914 bgcolor=#d6d6d6
| 496914 ||  || — || September 11, 2001 || Anderson Mesa || LONEOS ||  || align=right | 3.0 km || 
|-id=915 bgcolor=#d6d6d6
| 496915 ||  || — || September 19, 2001 || Kitt Peak || Spacewatch ||  || align=right | 2.2 km || 
|-id=916 bgcolor=#FA8072
| 496916 ||  || — || September 30, 2001 || Palomar || NEAT ||  || align=right data-sort-value="0.57" | 570 m || 
|-id=917 bgcolor=#d6d6d6
| 496917 ||  || — || August 23, 2001 || Kitt Peak || Spacewatch ||  || align=right | 2.5 km || 
|-id=918 bgcolor=#d6d6d6
| 496918 ||  || — || October 6, 2001 || Palomar || NEAT ||  || align=right | 2.8 km || 
|-id=919 bgcolor=#fefefe
| 496919 ||  || — || October 14, 2001 || Socorro || LINEAR || H || align=right data-sort-value="0.82" | 820 m || 
|-id=920 bgcolor=#E9E9E9
| 496920 ||  || — || October 15, 2001 || Kitt Peak || Spacewatch ||  || align=right | 1.3 km || 
|-id=921 bgcolor=#fefefe
| 496921 ||  || — || October 11, 2001 || Palomar || NEAT ||  || align=right data-sort-value="0.62" | 620 m || 
|-id=922 bgcolor=#E9E9E9
| 496922 ||  || — || October 14, 2001 || Apache Point || SDSS ||  || align=right data-sort-value="0.53" | 530 m || 
|-id=923 bgcolor=#d6d6d6
| 496923 ||  || — || October 17, 2001 || Socorro || LINEAR ||  || align=right | 2.9 km || 
|-id=924 bgcolor=#d6d6d6
| 496924 ||  || — || September 25, 2001 || Socorro || LINEAR ||  || align=right | 4.3 km || 
|-id=925 bgcolor=#d6d6d6
| 496925 ||  || — || October 16, 2001 || Kitt Peak || Spacewatch || THM || align=right | 2.2 km || 
|-id=926 bgcolor=#E9E9E9
| 496926 ||  || — || October 21, 2001 || Socorro || LINEAR ||  || align=right data-sort-value="0.90" | 900 m || 
|-id=927 bgcolor=#fefefe
| 496927 ||  || — || October 23, 2001 || Socorro || LINEAR || H || align=right data-sort-value="0.81" | 810 m || 
|-id=928 bgcolor=#fefefe
| 496928 ||  || — || October 21, 2001 || Socorro || LINEAR ||  || align=right data-sort-value="0.62" | 620 m || 
|-id=929 bgcolor=#E9E9E9
| 496929 ||  || — || October 17, 2001 || Socorro || LINEAR ||  || align=right data-sort-value="0.63" | 630 m || 
|-id=930 bgcolor=#d6d6d6
| 496930 ||  || — || October 19, 2001 || Palomar || NEAT ||  || align=right | 2.5 km || 
|-id=931 bgcolor=#E9E9E9
| 496931 ||  || — || October 16, 2001 || Palomar || NEAT ||  || align=right data-sort-value="0.67" | 670 m || 
|-id=932 bgcolor=#d6d6d6
| 496932 ||  || — || October 17, 2001 || Palomar || NEAT ||  || align=right | 2.8 km || 
|-id=933 bgcolor=#d6d6d6
| 496933 ||  || — || September 10, 2001 || Anderson Mesa || LONEOS ||  || align=right | 2.3 km || 
|-id=934 bgcolor=#d6d6d6
| 496934 ||  || — || October 15, 2001 || Kitt Peak || Spacewatch ||  || align=right | 3.3 km || 
|-id=935 bgcolor=#d6d6d6
| 496935 ||  || — || October 19, 2001 || Kitt Peak || Spacewatch ||  || align=right | 2.9 km || 
|-id=936 bgcolor=#E9E9E9
| 496936 ||  || — || November 14, 2001 || Kitt Peak || Spacewatch || EUN || align=right data-sort-value="0.94" | 940 m || 
|-id=937 bgcolor=#d6d6d6
| 496937 ||  || — || November 12, 2001 || Socorro || LINEAR ||  || align=right | 3.2 km || 
|-id=938 bgcolor=#d6d6d6
| 496938 ||  || — || October 23, 2001 || Socorro || LINEAR ||  || align=right | 3.7 km || 
|-id=939 bgcolor=#d6d6d6
| 496939 ||  || — || November 17, 2001 || Socorro || LINEAR ||  || align=right | 3.5 km || 
|-id=940 bgcolor=#d6d6d6
| 496940 ||  || — || November 17, 2001 || Socorro || LINEAR ||  || align=right | 2.8 km || 
|-id=941 bgcolor=#E9E9E9
| 496941 ||  || — || November 20, 2001 || Socorro || LINEAR ||  || align=right data-sort-value="0.85" | 850 m || 
|-id=942 bgcolor=#d6d6d6
| 496942 ||  || — || November 9, 2001 || Socorro || LINEAR ||  || align=right | 2.1 km || 
|-id=943 bgcolor=#E9E9E9
| 496943 ||  || — || November 20, 2001 || Socorro || LINEAR ||  || align=right | 1.6 km || 
|-id=944 bgcolor=#d6d6d6
| 496944 ||  || — || November 20, 2001 || Socorro || LINEAR ||  || align=right | 3.1 km || 
|-id=945 bgcolor=#E9E9E9
| 496945 ||  || — || December 9, 2001 || Socorro || LINEAR || (194) || align=right data-sort-value="0.97" | 970 m || 
|-id=946 bgcolor=#fefefe
| 496946 ||  || — || December 9, 2001 || Socorro || LINEAR || H || align=right data-sort-value="0.72" | 720 m || 
|-id=947 bgcolor=#d6d6d6
| 496947 ||  || — || December 10, 2001 || Socorro || LINEAR ||  || align=right | 2.6 km || 
|-id=948 bgcolor=#E9E9E9
| 496948 ||  || — || December 14, 2001 || Socorro || LINEAR ||  || align=right data-sort-value="0.79" | 790 m || 
|-id=949 bgcolor=#d6d6d6
| 496949 ||  || — || December 15, 2001 || Socorro || LINEAR ||  || align=right | 2.9 km || 
|-id=950 bgcolor=#E9E9E9
| 496950 ||  || — || December 18, 2001 || Socorro || LINEAR ||  || align=right data-sort-value="0.79" | 790 m || 
|-id=951 bgcolor=#E9E9E9
| 496951 ||  || — || December 9, 2001 || Socorro || LINEAR || ADE || align=right | 1.3 km || 
|-id=952 bgcolor=#E9E9E9
| 496952 ||  || — || January 9, 2002 || Socorro || LINEAR ||  || align=right | 1.6 km || 
|-id=953 bgcolor=#E9E9E9
| 496953 ||  || — || January 10, 2002 || Campo Imperatore || CINEOS ||  || align=right | 2.3 km || 
|-id=954 bgcolor=#E9E9E9
| 496954 ||  || — || January 8, 2002 || Socorro || LINEAR ||  || align=right data-sort-value="0.81" | 810 m || 
|-id=955 bgcolor=#E9E9E9
| 496955 ||  || — || January 9, 2002 || Socorro || LINEAR ||  || align=right data-sort-value="0.86" | 860 m || 
|-id=956 bgcolor=#E9E9E9
| 496956 ||  || — || January 11, 2002 || Kitt Peak || Spacewatch ||  || align=right | 1.9 km || 
|-id=957 bgcolor=#E9E9E9
| 496957 ||  || — || January 13, 2002 || Socorro || LINEAR ||  || align=right | 1.8 km || 
|-id=958 bgcolor=#d6d6d6
| 496958 ||  || — || February 7, 2002 || Socorro || LINEAR || EUP || align=right | 3.8 km || 
|-id=959 bgcolor=#E9E9E9
| 496959 ||  || — || January 14, 2002 || Kitt Peak || Spacewatch ||  || align=right | 1.1 km || 
|-id=960 bgcolor=#E9E9E9
| 496960 ||  || — || February 11, 2002 || Socorro || LINEAR ||  || align=right | 2.1 km || 
|-id=961 bgcolor=#fefefe
| 496961 ||  || — || April 10, 2002 || Socorro || LINEAR ||  || align=right data-sort-value="0.86" | 860 m || 
|-id=962 bgcolor=#FFC2E0
| 496962 ||  || — || April 8, 2002 || Palomar || NEAT || APO || align=right data-sort-value="0.18" | 180 m || 
|-id=963 bgcolor=#fefefe
| 496963 ||  || — || July 14, 2002 || Palomar || NEAT ||  || align=right data-sort-value="0.66" | 660 m || 
|-id=964 bgcolor=#fefefe
| 496964 ||  || — || July 22, 2002 || Palomar || NEAT || NYS || align=right data-sort-value="0.58" | 580 m || 
|-id=965 bgcolor=#FA8072
| 496965 ||  || — || August 10, 2002 || Socorro || LINEAR ||  || align=right | 1.8 km || 
|-id=966 bgcolor=#fefefe
| 496966 ||  || — || August 10, 2002 || Socorro || LINEAR ||  || align=right data-sort-value="0.91" | 910 m || 
|-id=967 bgcolor=#fefefe
| 496967 ||  || — || August 8, 2002 || Palomar || S. F. Hönig ||  || align=right data-sort-value="0.64" | 640 m || 
|-id=968 bgcolor=#fefefe
| 496968 ||  || — || August 8, 2002 || Palomar || NEAT || MAS || align=right data-sort-value="0.57" | 570 m || 
|-id=969 bgcolor=#fefefe
| 496969 ||  || — || August 15, 2002 || Palomar || NEAT ||  || align=right data-sort-value="0.54" | 540 m || 
|-id=970 bgcolor=#FA8072
| 496970 ||  || — || August 17, 2002 || Palomar || NEAT ||  || align=right data-sort-value="0.85" | 850 m || 
|-id=971 bgcolor=#fefefe
| 496971 ||  || — || August 29, 2002 || Palomar || NEAT ||  || align=right data-sort-value="0.76" | 760 m || 
|-id=972 bgcolor=#fefefe
| 496972 ||  || — || August 29, 2002 || Palomar || NEAT ||  || align=right data-sort-value="0.79" | 790 m || 
|-id=973 bgcolor=#fefefe
| 496973 ||  || — || August 18, 2002 || Palomar || NEAT || NYS || align=right data-sort-value="0.57" | 570 m || 
|-id=974 bgcolor=#fefefe
| 496974 ||  || — || August 17, 2002 || Palomar || NEAT ||  || align=right data-sort-value="0.52" | 520 m || 
|-id=975 bgcolor=#fefefe
| 496975 ||  || — || August 16, 2002 || Palomar || NEAT ||  || align=right data-sort-value="0.53" | 530 m || 
|-id=976 bgcolor=#fefefe
| 496976 ||  || — || August 29, 2002 || Palomar || NEAT || MAS || align=right data-sort-value="0.54" | 540 m || 
|-id=977 bgcolor=#fefefe
| 496977 ||  || — || August 27, 2002 || Palomar || NEAT ||  || align=right data-sort-value="0.67" | 670 m || 
|-id=978 bgcolor=#d6d6d6
| 496978 ||  || — || August 17, 2002 || Palomar || NEAT ||  || align=right | 2.1 km || 
|-id=979 bgcolor=#fefefe
| 496979 ||  || — || August 16, 2002 || Palomar || NEAT || NYS || align=right data-sort-value="0.44" | 440 m || 
|-id=980 bgcolor=#fefefe
| 496980 ||  || — || August 17, 2002 || Palomar || NEAT ||  || align=right data-sort-value="0.55" | 550 m || 
|-id=981 bgcolor=#FFC2E0
| 496981 ||  || — || September 5, 2002 || Socorro || LINEAR || APOcritical || align=right data-sort-value="0.20" | 200 m || 
|-id=982 bgcolor=#d6d6d6
| 496982 ||  || — || September 4, 2002 || Palomar || NEAT ||  || align=right | 2.2 km || 
|-id=983 bgcolor=#d6d6d6
| 496983 ||  || — || September 5, 2002 || Socorro || LINEAR ||  || align=right | 1.9 km || 
|-id=984 bgcolor=#fefefe
| 496984 ||  || — || September 11, 2002 || Palomar || NEAT ||  || align=right data-sort-value="0.67" | 670 m || 
|-id=985 bgcolor=#fefefe
| 496985 ||  || — || September 11, 2002 || Palomar || NEAT || NYS || align=right data-sort-value="0.67" | 670 m || 
|-id=986 bgcolor=#fefefe
| 496986 ||  || — || September 13, 2002 || Palomar || NEAT ||  || align=right data-sort-value="0.88" | 880 m || 
|-id=987 bgcolor=#fefefe
| 496987 ||  || — || September 13, 2002 || Palomar || NEAT ||  || align=right data-sort-value="0.82" | 820 m || 
|-id=988 bgcolor=#fefefe
| 496988 ||  || — || September 14, 2002 || Palomar || NEAT ||  || align=right data-sort-value="0.66" | 660 m || 
|-id=989 bgcolor=#d6d6d6
| 496989 ||  || — || September 13, 2002 || Palomar || NEAT ||  || align=right | 2.0 km || 
|-id=990 bgcolor=#fefefe
| 496990 ||  || — || September 14, 2002 || Palomar || R. Matson ||  || align=right data-sort-value="0.47" | 470 m || 
|-id=991 bgcolor=#fefefe
| 496991 ||  || — || September 14, 2002 || Palomar || NEAT ||  || align=right data-sort-value="0.71" | 710 m || 
|-id=992 bgcolor=#d6d6d6
| 496992 ||  || — || September 5, 2002 || Haleakala || NEAT || 3:2 || align=right | 4.2 km || 
|-id=993 bgcolor=#d6d6d6
| 496993 ||  || — || September 12, 2002 || Palomar || NEAT || KOR || align=right | 1.2 km || 
|-id=994 bgcolor=#fefefe
| 496994 ||  || — || October 13, 2002 || Palomar || NEAT ||  || align=right data-sort-value="0.62" | 620 m || 
|-id=995 bgcolor=#fefefe
| 496995 ||  || — || October 9, 2002 || Kitt Peak || Spacewatch ||  || align=right data-sort-value="0.79" | 790 m || 
|-id=996 bgcolor=#d6d6d6
| 496996 ||  || — || October 5, 2002 || Apache Point || SDSS ||  || align=right | 2.2 km || 
|-id=997 bgcolor=#fefefe
| 496997 ||  || — || October 5, 2002 || Apache Point || SDSS ||  || align=right data-sort-value="0.68" | 680 m || 
|-id=998 bgcolor=#d6d6d6
| 496998 ||  || — || October 4, 2002 || Palomar || NEAT || SHU3:2 || align=right | 4.6 km || 
|-id=999 bgcolor=#d6d6d6
| 496999 ||  || — || October 6, 2002 || Palomar || NEAT ||  || align=right | 1.9 km || 
|-id=000 bgcolor=#d6d6d6
| 497000 ||  || — || October 29, 2002 || Socorro || LINEAR ||  || align=right | 4.3 km || 
|}

References

External links 
 Discovery Circumstances: Numbered Minor Planets (495001)–(500000) (IAU Minor Planet Center)

0496